The Internet Governance Forum (IGF) is a multistakeholder governance group for policy dialogue on issues of Internet governance. It brings together all stakeholders in the Internet governance debate, whether they represent governments, the private sector or civil society, including the technical and academic community, on an equal basis and through an open and inclusive process. The establishment of the IGF was formally announced by the United Nations Secretary-General in July 2006. It was first convened in October–November 2006 and has held an annual meeting since then.

History and development of the Internet Governance Forum

WSIS Phase I, WGIG, and WSIS Phase II 
The first phase of World Summit on the Information Society (WSIS), held in Geneva in December 2003, failed to agree on the future of Internet governance, but did agree to continue the dialogue and requested the United Nations Secretary-General to establish a multi-stakeholder Working Group on Internet Governance (WGIG).

Following a series of open consultations in 2004 and 2005 and after reaching a clear consensus among its members the WGIG proposed the creation of the IGF as one of four proposals made in its final report. Paragraph 40 of the WGIG report stated:

"(t)he WGIG identified a vacuum within the context of existing structures, since there is no global multi-stakeholder forum to address Internet-related public policy issues. It came to the conclusion that there would be merit in creating such a space for dialogue among all stakeholders. This space could address these issues, as well as emerging issues, that are cross-cutting and multidimensional and that either affect more than one institution, are not dealt with by any institution or are not addressed in a coordinated manner".

The WGIG report was one of the inputs to the second phase of the World Summit on the Information Society held in Tunis in 2005.

The idea of the Forum was also proposed by Argentina, as stated in its proposal made during the last Prepcom 3 in Tunis:

"In order to strengthen the global multistakeholder interaction and cooperation on public policy issues and developmental aspects relating to Internet governance we propose a forum.  This forum should not replace existing mechanisms or institutions but should build on the existing structures on Internet governance, should contribute to the sustainability, stability and robustness of the Internet by addressing appropriately public policy issues that are not otherwise being adequately addressed excluding any involvement in the day to day operation of the Internet. It should be constituted as a neutral, non-duplicative and non-binding process to facilitate the exchange of information and best practices and to identify issues and make known its findings, to enhance awareness and build consensus and engagement. Recognizing the rapid development of technology and institutions, we propose that the forum mechanism periodically be reviewed to determine the need for its continuation."

The second phase of WSIS, held in Tunis in November 2005, formally called for the creation of the IGF and set out its mandate. Paragraph 72 of the Tunis Agenda called on the UN Secretary-General to convene a meeting with regards to the new multi-stakeholder forum to be known as the IGF.

The Tunis WSIS meeting did not reach an agreement on any of the other WGIG proposals that generally focused on new oversight functions for the Internet that would reduce or eliminate the special role that the United States plays with respect to Internet governance through its contractual oversight of ICANN. The US Government's position during the lead-up to the Tunis WSIS meeting was flexible on the principle of global involvement, very strong on the principle of multi-stakeholder participation, but inflexible on the need for US control to remain for the foreseeable future in order to ensure the "security and stability of the Internet".

2005 mandate
The mandate for the IGF is contained in the 2005 WSIS Tunis Agenda. The IGF was mandated to be principally a discussion forum for facilitating dialogue between the Forum's participants. The IGF may "identify emerging issues, bring them to the attention of the relevant bodies and the general public, and, where appropriate, make recommendations," but does not have any direct decision-making authority. In this mandate, different stakeholders are encouraged to strengthen engagement, particularly those from developing countries. In paragraph 72(h), the mandate focused on capacity-building for developing countries and the drawing out of local resources. This particular effort, for instance, has been reinforced through Diplo Foundation's Internet Governance Capacity Building Programme (IGCBP) that allowed participants from different regions to benefit from valuable resources with the help of regional experts in Internet governance.

Formation of the IGF
The United Nations published its endorsement of a five-year mandate for the IGF in April 2006.

There were two rounds of consultations with regards to the convening of the first IGF:

16 – 17 of February 2006 – The first round of consultations was held in Geneva.  The transcripts of the two-day consultations are available in the IGF site.
19 May 2006 – The second round of consultations was open to all stakeholders and was coordinated for the preparations of the inaugural IGF meeting. The meeting chairman was Nitin Desai who is the United Nations Secretary-General's Special Adviser for Internet Governance.

The convening of the IGF was announced on 18 July 2006, with the inaugural meeting of the Forum to be held in Athens, Greece from 30 October to 2 November 2006.

2011 mandate renewal and improvements process
In the lead-up to the completion of the first five-year mandate of the IGF in 2010, the UN initiated a process of evaluating the continuation of the IGF, resulting in a United Nations General Assembly resolution to continue the IGF for a further five years (2011-2015).

In addition to the renewed mandate, another UN body, the Commission on Science and Technology for Development (CSTD), established a Working Group on Improvements to the IGF (CSTDWG), which first met in February 2011, held five working group meetings, completed its work in early 2012, and issued a report to the Commission for consideration during its 15th session to be held 21–25 May 2012, in Geneva.

The Working Group report made 15 recommendations with regard to five specific areas, namely: 
Shaping of the outcomes of IGF meetings (2); 
Working modalities of the IGF, including open consultations, the Multi-stakeholder Advisory Group (MAG) and the Secretariat (3); 
Funding of the IGF (3); 
Broadening participation and capacity-building (4); and 
Linking the IGF to other Internet governance-related entities (3).

At its meeting held from 21 to 25 May 2012 the CSTD made the following recommendations to the Economic and Social Council regarding Internet governance and the Internet Governance Forum, which the Council accepted at its meeting on 24 July 2012:

25. Takes note that the CSTD Working Group on improvements to the Internet Governance Forum successfully completed its task;
26. Takes note with appreciation of the report of the Working Group on improvements to the Internet Governance Forum and expresses its gratitude to all its members for their time and valuable efforts in this endeavour as well as to all member states and other relevant stakeholders that have submitted inputs to the Working Group consultation process;
35. Urges the Secretary-General to ensure the continued functioning of the IGF and its structures in preparation for the seventh meeting of the Internet Governance Forum, to be held from 6 to 9 November 2012 in Baku, Azerbaijan and future meetings of the Internet Governance Forum;
36. Notes the necessity to appoint the Special Advisor to the Secretary-General on Internet Governance and the Executive Coordinator to the IGF.

2015 mandate renewal

The second five-year mandate of the IGF ended in 2015. On 16 December 2015 the United Nations General Assembly adopted the outcome document on the 10-year review of the implementation of the outcomes of the World Summit on the Information Society. Among other things the outcome document urges the need to promote greater participation and engagement in Internet governance discussions that should involve governments, the private sector, civil society, international organizations, the technical and academic communities, and all other relevant stakeholders. It acknowledges the role the Internet Governance Forum (IGF) has played as a multistakeholder platform for discussion of Internet governance issues. And it extends the existing mandate of the IGF as set out in paragraphs 72 to 78 of the Tunis Agenda for a third period of ten years. During the ten-year period, the IGF should continue to show progress on working modalities, and participation of relevant stakeholders from developing countries.

IGF Retreat, July 2016

After the UN General Assembly extended the IGF's mandate for ten additional years in December 2015, but before the December 2016 IGF meeting in Mexico, an IGF Retreat was held on 14–16 July 2016 in Glen Cove, New York to focus on "Advancing the 10-Year Mandate of the Internet Governance Forum".  At the time that the IGF mandate was extended, the UN General Assembly called for "progress on working modalities and the participation of relevant stakeholders from developing countries" and "accelerated implementation of recommendations in the report of the UN Commission on Science and Technology for Development (CSTD) Working Group on Improvements to the IGF."

Thus the retreat was framed by the mandates of the Tunis Agenda and WSIS+10 review. It also aimed to build on the report of the CSTD Working Group on improvements to the IGF and the many years of reflection of the MAG and the IGF community on improving the working methods of the IGF. The retreat was to focus on "how" the IGF could best work to deliver its role and how it could be best supported. As it focused on the "how", it would not try to carry out the substantive discussions that are to happen in the IGF itself.

The retreat reached the following understandings:
 In addition to its renewal of the IGF's mandate in December 2015, the UN General Assembly expressed expectations, specifically the need to show progress on working modalities and the participation of relevant stakeholders from developing countries, as well as for the accelerated implementation of the  recommendations of the CSTD Working Group on improvements to the IGF.
 There was also recognition that improvements have been and continue to be made on an ongoing basis. 
 The relevance of the IGF in the future is not assured, being dependent inter alia on increased voluntary funding to the multi-donor extra-budgetary IGF Trust Fund Project of the UN that funds the IGF Secretariat and on increased participation from a balanced and diverse set of stakeholders.
 Other fora are emerging for those wishing to engage in discussions about Internet governance. This suggested that the IGF's distinctiveness and value within this range of alternatives would need to remain sufficient to maintain participation levels from governments and the private sector in particular. 
 A few participants felt that the MAG does not engage all parts of the community who want to take part in the discussion on Internet governance, and the IGF itself as well as the various intersessional activities could address this. 
 The IGF has evolved over the years and is now seen by many as much more than an annual forum. Increasingly, it is seen as an ecosystem including national and regional IGFs, intersessional work, best practice fora, dynamic coalitions and other activities. 
 More could be done to take a strategic, long-term view of the role and activities of the IGF, such as through a predictable multi-year programme of work. Even if not undertaken generally, it might be possible to reinvigorate the IGF by taking a longer term view of particular issues, dedicating time and resources to progressing discussions and achieving concrete outcomes on these over time. it might be possible to move towards a continuous, predictable process for programming the work of the IGF. 
 The IGF's innovative and unconventional multistakeholder structure and culture, compared with other UN processes, is generally felt to be one of its strengths. However, it also made it more difficult to integrate it with other UN processes. The same is true with respect to integrating the IGF and its institutional arrangements comfortably into expectations of multistakeholder processes. One of the challenges therefore is how to reconcile its bottom-up approach and stakeholder expectations with other multilateral processes within the UN system.
 The role of the MAG, in particular whether the MAG is expected or authorized to take on responsibilities beyond the programming of the annual IGF meetings,   needs to be clarified in order to pursue significant innovations in the IGF.
 It was generally felt that the IGF Secretariat is under-resourced and hence lacks capacities for its current responsibilities, let alone additional activities.

Organizational structure

Following an open consultation meeting called in February 2006, the UN Secretary-General established an Advisory Group (now known as the Multistakeholder Advisory Group, or MAG), and a Secretariat, as the main institutional bodies of the IGF.

Multistakeholder Advisory Group (MAG)
The Advisory Group, now known as the Multistakeholder Advisory Group (MAG), was established by the then UN Secretary-General, Kofi Annan on 17 May 2006, to assist in convening the first IGF, held in Athens, Greece. The MAG's mandate has been renewed or extended each year to provide assistance in the preparations for each upcoming IGF meeting.

The MAG meets for two days three times each year — in February, May and September. All three meetings take place in Geneva and are preceded by a one-day Open Consultations meeting. The details on the MAG's operating principles and selection criteria are contained in the summary reports of its meetings.

The MAG was originally made up of 46 members, but membership grew first to 47, then 50, and eventually 56. Members are from international governments, the commercial private sector and public civil society, including academic and technical communities.  The MAG tries to renew roughly one third of the members within each stakeholder group each year. In 2011, because there were only three new MAG members in 2010, it was suggested that two thirds of each group's membership be renewed in 2012 and in fact 33 new members were appointed to the 56 member group.

The first MAG chairman was Nitin Desai, an Indian economist and former UN Under-Secretary-General for Economic and Social Affairs from 1992 to 2003.  He also served as the Secretary-General's Special Adviser for the World Summit on the Information Society, later Special Advisor for Internet Governance.

 In 2007 Nitin Desai and Brazilian diplomat Hadil da Rocha Vianna served as co-chairs of the MAG. 
 In 2008, 2009 and 2010 Nitin Desai served as MAG chair. 
 In 2011 Alice Munyua, the Chair of the Kenyan IGF Steering Committee, was MAG chair. 
 In 2012 Elmir Valizada, Deputy Minister of Communications and Information Technology, Azerbaijan was MAG chair. 
 In 2013  Ashwin Sasongko, Director General of ICT Application, Ministry of Communication and Information Technology (CIT), Indonesia served as Honorary Chair with  Markus Kummer, Vice-President for Public Policy of the Internet Society as interim chair of the MAG.
 In 2014 and 2015 Jānis Kārkliņš, Ambassador-at-Large for the Government of Latvia, former Assistant Director-General of Communication and Information of UNESCO, Latvian Ambassador to France, Andorra, Monaco and UNESCO and participant in the World Summit on Information Society, serves as MAG chair.
 In 2016 United Nations Secretary-General Ban Ki-moon appointed Lynn St. Amour of the United States as the new MAG chair.  Amour served from 2001 to 2014 as President and CEO of the Internet Society.
 In 2019 United Nations Secretary-General António Guterres appointed Anriette Esterhuysen of the Republic of South Africa as the new MAG chair. Before the appointment Esterhuysen was the Executive Director of the Association for Progressive Communications.

Secretariat
The Secretariat, based in the United Nations Office in Geneva, assists and coordinates the work of the Multistakeholder Advisory Group (MAG). The Secretariat also hosts internships and fellowships. The Secretariat's Executive Coordinator position is currently vacant. Chengetai Masango is IGF Programme and Technology Manager.

Until 31 January 2011 the IGF Secretariat was headed by Executive Coordinator Markus Kummer.  Kummer was also Executive Coordinator of the Secretariat of the UN Working Group on Internet Governance (WGIG). On 1 February 2011 he joined the Internet Society as its Vice President for Public Policy.

Activities at the IGF 
The following activities take place during IGF meetings: Main or focus sessions, Workshops, Dynamic Coalition meetings, Best Practice Forums, Side meetings, Host Country Sessions, 'Flash' Sessions, Open Forums, Inter-regional dialogue sessions, Newcomers track sessions, Lightning sessions, Unconference sessions, Pre-events, and the IGF Village.

Main or focus sessions 
 The first IGF meeting in Greece in 2006 was organized around the main themes of: openness, security, diversity, and access. 
 For IGF Brazil in 2007 a new theme, critical Internet resources, was introduced. 
 For 2009 through 2012 there were six standard themes: (i) Internet governance for development, (ii) Emerging issues, (iii) Managing critical Internet resources, (iv) Security, openness, and privacy, (v) Access and diversity, and (vi) Taking stock and the way forward. 
 For IGF Indonesia in 2013 the six main themes were: (i) Access and Diversity - Internet as an engine for growth and sustainable development; (ii) Openness - Human rights, freedom of expression and free flow of information on the Internet; (iii) Security - Legal and other frameworks: spam, hacking and cyber-crime; (iv) Enhanced cooperation; (v) Principles of multi-stakeholder cooperation; (vi) Internet governance principles. 
 For IGF Turkey in 2014 the eight main themes were: (i) Policies Enabling Access; (ii) Content Creation, Dissemination and Use; (iii) Internet as an Engine for Growth and Development; (iv) IGF and The Future of the Internet Ecosystem; (v) Enhancing Digital Trust; (vi) Internet and Human Rights; (vii) Critical Internet Resources; and (viii) Emerging issues.
 For IGF Brazil in 2015 the eight main themes were: (i) Cybersecurity and Trust; (ii) Internet Economy; (iii) Inclusiveness and Diversity; (iv) Openness; (v) Enhancing Multistakeholder Cooperation; (vi) Internet and Human Rights; (vii) Critical Internet Resources; and (viii) Emerging issues.
 For IGF Mexico in 2016 a less formal and more bottom up approach was used to develop the meeting's main themes. The nine themes that emerged were:  (i) Sustainable Development and the Internet Economy; (ii) Access and Diversity; (iii) Gender and Youth Issues; (iv) Human Rights Online; (v) Cybersecurity; (vi) Multistakeholder Cooperation; (vii) Critical Internet Resources; (viii) Internet governance capacity building; and (ix) Emerging Issues that may affect the future of the open Internet.

Workshops 
Each year starting in 2007, the IGF has hosted a number of workshops (workshop with panel, roundtable, capacity building session).

Examples of workshops held at IGF meetings include:

 Universalization of the Internet - How to reach the next billion (Expanding the Internet)
 Low cost sustainable access
 Multilingualization
 Implications for development policy
 Managing the Internet (Using the Internet)
 Critical Internet resources
 Arrangements for Internet governance
 Global cooperation for Internet security and stability
 Taking stock and the way forward
 Emerging issues
 Internet Governance and RPKI
 Spectrum for Democracy and Development
 Internet Regulation for Improved Access in Emerging Markets
 Understanding Internet Infrastructure: an Overview of Technology and Terminology
 Freedom of expression and freedom from hate on-line (Young People Combating Hate Speech On-line)
 Protecting the rule of law in the online environment
 Evaluating Internet Freedom Initiatives: What works?
 DNSSEC for ccTLDs: Securing National Domains

 Media pluralism and freedom of expression in the Internet age
 An industry lead approach for making internet a better place for kids
 Best Common Practices for Building Internet Capacity
 Law Enforcement via Domain Names: Caveats to DNS Neutrality
 Defining the Successful Factors of Different Models for Youth Participation in Internet Governance
 How to engage users on Internet Policies?
 New gTLDs: Implications and Potential for Community Engagement, advocacy and Development
 Human Rights, Internet Policy and the Public Policy Role of ICANN
 Innovative application of ICTs to facilitate child protection online
 EURid/UNESCO World Report on IDN Deployment 2012 – opportunities and challenges associated with IDNs and online multilingualism
 The Benefits of Using Advanced Mobile Technologies and Global Spectrum Harmonization
 Empowering Internet Users – which tools?

Dynamic coalitions 
The most tangible result of the first IGF in Athens was the establishment of a number of so-called Dynamic Coalitions. These coalitions are relatively informal, issue-specific groups consisting of stakeholders that are interested in the particular issue. Most coalitions allow participation of anyone interested in contributing. Thus, these groups gather not only academics and representatives of governments, but also members of the civil society interested in participating on the debates and engaged in the coalition's works.

Active Dynamic Coalitions:

 Accessibility and Disability
 Child Online Safety
 Core Internet Values
 Freedom of Expression and Freedom of the Media on the Internet (FOEonline)
 Gender and Internet Governance
 Internet and Climate Change
 Internet of Things
 Internet Rights and Principles / Internet Bill of Rights
 Network Neutrality
 Platform Responsibility
 Public Access in Libraries
 Youth Coalition on Internet Governance

Inactive Dynamic Coalitions:

 Access and Connectivity for Remote, Rural and Dispersed Communities
 Access 2 Knowledge (A2K@IGF)
 Framework of Principles for the Internet
 Global Localization Platform
 Linguistic Diversity
 Online Collaboration
 Online Education
 Open Standards
 Privacy
 Social Media and Legal Issues 
 Stop Spam Alliance

Best practice forums
Starting in 2014 these sessions demonstrate some of the best practices that have been adapted with regard to the key IGF themes and the development and deployment of the Internet. The sessions provide an opportunity to discuss what constitutes a "best practice", to share relevant information and experiences and build consensus around best practices that can then be transferred to other situations, and strengthen capacity building activities.

The five Best Practice Forums held during IGF 2014 were:
 Developing Meaningful Multistakeholder Mechanisms;
 Regulation and Mitigation of Unwanted Communications (Spam);
 Establishing and Supporting CERTs for Internet Security;
 Creating an Enabling Environment for the Development of Local Content; and
 Online Child Safety and Protection.

'Flash' sessions
A flash session provides an opportunity for presenters/organisers to evoke/sparkle interest of the participants in specific reports, case studies, best practices, methodologies, tools, etc. that have already been implemented or are in the process of implementation. Participants have an opportunity to ask very specific questions. Flash Sessions will generally be shorter than other types of sessions.

Flash sessions held at IGF 2014 were:
 Internet and Jurisdiction Project; and
 Crowd Sourced Solutions to Bridge the Gender Digital Divide

Open forums
All major organizations dealing with Internet governance related issues are given a 90-minute time slot, at their request, to hold an Open Forum in order to present and discuss their activities during the past year and allow for questions and discussions.

Examples of recent Open fora include:

 Consultation on ten-year review of WSIS (CSTD)
 The Economics of an Open Internet (OECD)
 Governmental Advisory Committee (GAC) Open Forum (ICANN)
 ICANN Open Forum 
 Internet & Jurisdiction Policy Network Open Forum  
 ISOC@IGF: Dedicated to an open accessible Internet (Internet Society)
 South Korea's effort to advance the Internet environment including IPv6 deployment (MSIP and KISA)
 Launch of Revised Guidelines on for Industry on Child Online Protection (ITU and UNICEF)
 Measuring what and how: Capturing the effects of the Internet we want (World Wide Web Foundation)
 Multi-stakeholder Consultation on UNESCO's Comprehensive Study on the Internet (UNESCO)
 Protecting Human Rights Online (Freedom Online Coalition)
 Your Internet, Our Aim: Guide Internet Users to Their Human Rights (Council of Europe)

Regional, national, and youth initiatives
A number of regional, national, and youth initiatives hold separate meetings throughout the year and an inter-regional dialogue session at the annual IGF meeting. EuroDIG was the first regional IGF initiative, initiated in 2008. 

Youth IGF initiatives:
 Youth IGF Movement
 Youth IGF Project
 Youth Observatory

 Asia Pacific Youth IGF
 German Youth IGF 
 Hong Kong, Youth IGF of
 Latin America and Caribbean, Youth IGF of (LACIGF)
 Netherlands Youth IGF
 Turkey, Youth IGF of

Regional IGF initiatives:
 African IGF (AfIGF)
 Arab IGF 
 Asia Pacific IGF (APrIGF)
 Caribbean IGF (CIGF)
 Central Africa IGF  
 Central Asia IGF (CAIGF)
 Commonwealth IGF 
 East Africa IGF (EA-IGF)
 European Dialog on Internet Governance (EuroDIG)
 Latin American and Caribbean IGF (LAC IGF)
 Macao IGF
 Persian IGF
 Southern Africa IGF
 South Eastern European Dialogue on Internet Governance (SEEDIG)
 West Africa IGF

National IGF initiatives:
 Afghanistan
 Argentina
 Armenia
 Australia
 Austrian
 Azerbaijan
 Bangladesh
 Barbados
 Belarus
 Benin
 Bosnia and Herzegovina
 Brazil 
 Canada
 Chad
 Colombia
 Croatia
 Danish 
 Dominican Republic
 Ecuador
 Estonia
 Georgia
 Finland
 Germany 
 Ghana
 Greece
 Indonesia (ID-IGF)
 Italy 
 Japan
 Kenya
 Malawi

 
 Malta
 Mexico
 Moldova
 Mozambique 
 Nepal
 Netherlands
 New Zealand
 Nigeria
 Panama
 Paraguay
 Peru
 Poland
 Portugal
 Russia
 Slovenia
 South Africa
 Spain
 Sri Lanka
 Switzerland
 Togo 
 Trinidad and Tobago
 Tunis
 Uganda
 Ukraine
 United Kingdom
 United States
 Uruguay
 Zimbabwe

Lightning sessions

At IGF 2016 Lightning sessions were introduced as quicker, more informal versions of full-length workshops or presentations. The 20-minute sessions took place during lunch breaks in a shaded outdoor plaza in front of the venue. A few examples of the 23 Lightning sessions held in 2016 include:
 Are Tribunals re-inventing Global Internet Governance?
 Sharing research on tech-facilitated crimes against children
 Research and Policy Advocacy Tools for #WomensRightsOnline
 Internet users’ data and their unlawful use       
 Governance of Cyber Identity
 Unveiling Surveillance Practices in Latin America
 Redefining Broadband Affordability for a more Inclusive Internet
 Holding algorithms accountable to protect fundamental rights
 Human Rights Online: Internet Access and minorities
 Anonymity vs Hate speech?
 Conflict Management & Human Rights on the Internet
 Electronic voting: Is not digital the future of democracy?

Unconference sessions

At IGF 2016 Unconference sessions were introduced. The 20 to 40 minute talks are not pre-scheduled, participants reserve a speaking slot by signing up on a scheduling board on a first-come, first-served basis on the day of the Unconference. Five Unconference talks took place at IGF 2016:
 Freedom of Expression and Religion in Asia: Desecrating Expression – Launch of a Report 
 #africaninternetrights - a best practice policy 
 Derecho de videojuegos (videogames law) y Ciberseguridad: "El Nuevo Internet of Toys" [Super Lawyer Bros.] 
 Free Trade Agreements and IG in Latin America
 Violencia Digital in the World

Newcomers track

Introduced at IGF 2016 the Newcomers track helps participants attending the IGF meeting for the first time, to understand the IGF processes, foster the integration of all new-coming stakeholders into the IGF community, and  make the meeting participant's first IGF experience as productive and welcoming as possible.  Newcomer sessions held in 2016 included:
 What is the IGF?
 Newcomers Mentor Session
 'Knowledge cafes':
 Private sector and Technical community at the IGF: What is the role of these stakeholder groups within the IGF and ways for engagement? 
 Governments and IGOs at the IGF: What's the role of these stakeholder groups in the IGF processes and ways for engagement?
 The role of Civil Society within the IGF: work modalities and ways for engagement
 Wrap up: Taking Stock and How to engage in the IGF 2017 community intersessional work

IGF Village

The IGF Village provides booths and meeting areas where participants may present their organizations and hold informal meetings.

Pre-events

Examples of pre-events held the day before the IGF Turkey meeting in 2014 include:

 A Safe, Secure, Sustainable Internet and the Role of Stakeholders
 Collaborative Leadership Exchange on Multistakeholder Participation
 Commercial Law Development Program (CLDP) Supported Delegations Pre-Conference Seminar 	
 Empowering Grassroots Level Organizations Through the .ORG Top Level Domain
 Global Internet Governance Academic Network (GigaNet)
 Governance in a Mobile Social Web – Finding the Markers
 IGF Support Association
 Integration of Diasporas and Displaced People Through ICT
 Multilingualism Applied in Africa
 NETmundial + Book Release – Beyond NETmundial: The Roadmap for Institutional Improvements to the Global Internet
 Sex, Rights and Internet Governance
 Supporting Innovation on Internet Development in the global south through evaluation, research communication and resource mobilization
 UN Commission on Science and Technology for Development (CSTD) 10-year review of WSIS - Arab Perspective

IGF meetings

Four-day IGF meetings have been held in the last quarter of each year starting in 2006.

IGF I — Athens, Greece 2006 
The first meeting of the IGF was held in Athens, Greece from 30 October to 2 November 2006. The overall theme for the meeting was: "Internet Governance for Development". The agenda was structured along five broad themes: (i) Openness - Freedom of expression, free flow of information, ideas and knowledge; (ii) Security - Creating trust and confidence through collaboration; (iii) Diversity - Promoting multilingualism and local content; and (iv) Access - Internet connectivity, policy and cost; and (v) Emerging issues, with capacity-building as a cross-cutting priority.

Setting the scene: The moderator himself recalled that 10 years a similar gathering was mainly attended by engineers and academics from North America and Europe, while this meeting had a much broader participations, both in terms of geography as well as stakeholder groups. One panellist made the remarks that four years ago many people assembled in the meeting room would not have spoken to one another. One of the moderators called the panel sessions a giant experiment and a giant brainstorming. He also recalled the Secretary-General's comment that the IGF entered uncharted waters in fostering a dialogue among all stakeholders as equals. The innovative format was generally accepted and well received and some commentators called it a true breakthrough in multi-stakeholder cooperation. Several speakers noted that IGF is not the beginning of this process but the middle of, much has already been achieved in the WSIS process and the IGF must build on that. It was remarked that all stakeholders have roles to play in the IGF. We need to share experiences and perspectives.  We need to share best practices. The theme of development was emphasized with several speakers asking what that IGF could do for the billions who do not yet have access. The main message of this session was that no single stakeholder could do it alone and therefore we all needed to work on IG issue in development together. To conclude it was felt that for the IGF to have value we would have to leave Athens with a clear view of how to move forward.
Openness - Freedom of expression, free flow of information, ideas and knowledge: This session focused on the free flow of information and on freedom of information on the one hand and access to information and knowledge on the other. Much of the discussion was devoted to finding the right balance between freedom of expression and responsible use of this freedom, and the balance between protecting copyright and ensuring access to knowledge.
Security - Creating trust and confidence through collaboration: There was a generally held view that the growing significance of the Internet in economic and social activities raised continuing and complex security issues. One of the key issues here is the way in which responses to growing security threats are dependent on the implementation of processes of authentication and identification. Such processes can only be effective where there is a trusted third party that can guarantee both authentication and identification. This raised the question of who could effectively act as a trusted third party, the state or the private sector. There was a widely held view that the best approach to resolving security issues is based on ‘best practises’ and multi-stakeholder co-operation in an international context.  However, there was concern about the degree to which information was shared in a timely manner and in a common format (particularly with developing countries). There was a debate as to whether market based solutions, which stimulate innovation, or a public goods model would deliver better security measures across the Internet. For some, the public goods approach offered the opportunity for the widespread adoption of best practice across all countries. A counter view was that innovative solutions were required at that these could only be provided by market based activities. There was a wide-ranging, but inconclusive debate about the role of open standards in shaping security solutions.
Diversity - Promoting multilingualism and local content: but there was strong agreement that the multilingualism is a driving requirement for diversity in the Internet, that the event was not about the ‘digital divide’, but rather about the ‘linguistic divide’. There was recognition that diversity extended beyond linguistic diversity to cover populations challenged by lack of literacy in the dominating language or by disability. UNESCO drew attention to the Universal Declaration on Cultural Diversity mentioning that its purpose was to support the expressions of culture and identity through the diversity of languages. Participants raised the issue of software, pointing out that market forces were sometimes not strong enough to provide countries with software in the languages they required. During the discussion on internationalized domain names (IDNs), it was generally felt that internationalizing these domain names without endangering the stability and security of the Internet remained one of the largest challenges. 
Access - Internet connectivity, policy and cost: Increasing access remains one of the great challenges facing the Internet community. A theme that emerged was the introduction of competition and the removal of blocks to competition were of fundamental importance. It was recognized that Africa faced particularly complex problems with regard to access to ICT resources. It was widely expected that wireless technologies could change the access market landscape. There was a broad convergence of views that the most appropriate level to address issues of access was the national level, as most policy development and implementation is at the national level.
Emerging issues: The session included video link-ups with remote participants at locations in Chile, Mexico, and Peru. There was the sense of a growing digital divide due in large part to lack of access which in turn was due to high costs. Access, according to several of the panelists should be a fundamental human right because without access the young cannot grow up to truly live in the modern world. The hope was expressed that the IGF would enable youth to get more involved in Internet governance issues. 
Other events: A total of 36 workshops were held in parallel to the main sessions. Reports from these workshops were made available on the IGF Web site.

IGF II — Rio de Janeiro, Brazil 2007 
The second meeting of the IGF was held in Rio de Janeiro on 12–15 November 2007. The overall theme for the meeting was: "Internet Governance for Development". The main sessions were organized around five themes: (i) Critical Internet resources; (ii) Access; (iii) Diversity; (iv) Openness, and (v) Security.

 Opening ceremony / Opening session: The multi-stakeholder approach was highlighted by many speakers and panelists during the Opening Session, including the message from the UN Secretary-General Ban Ki-Moon, which was read by the UN Under-Secretary-General for Economic and Social Affairs, M. Sha Zukang. M. Ban Ki-Moon assured that it is not a UN goal to take over Internet Governance, but the UN will offer an opportunity to bring people with similar interests together to reach their common goals. M. Sha Zukang concluded that the IGF was a unique experience because "it brings together people who normally do not meet under the same roof." The nature and prospective of the IGF were also discussed, as the Chairman properly summarizes:
"Several participants underlined that the IGF was not only a space for dialogue, but also a medium that should encourage fundamental change at the local level to empower communities, build capacity and skills enable the Internet's expansion, thereby contributing to economic and social development."
 Critical Internet resources: This is a new session. It covered issues pertaining to the infrastructure of the Internet including the roles of ICANN and of governments in shaping policies.
 Access: The issue of "access" is about how to get the next billion users to go online in the years to come.  Initiatives with this goal are reminiscent of pilot projects in Africa where laptops were given to children under an open source software agreement.
 Diversity: "Diversity" calls for multilingualism in the Net. Promotion of multilingualism would increase the number of users whose main language is not English. In order to open the Net to a diverse population, international domain names (IDN) were added to facilitate the language needs of other users.
 Openness: The strong support on closed software has not been favorable to some people. This is because there were long-lasting agreements between governments and large software companies. Such actions were considered critical, as it binds different entities to proprietary or closed source technologies. Many believed that the shift from closed to open software can only happen with the full-scale participation of both the private and public sectors. As such, many people fear the turning of the Internet into a "private" network if there is much insistence on the use of closed technologies. Talks on open standards, open architecture and open software are clear indicators of what the issue on openness is all about. See the book Free Culture by Lawrence Lessig to learn more about "Openness on the Internet."
 Security: Internet Security questions on the agenda were related to: Cybercrime, Cyber-terrorism, Protection of individuals and automatic processing of personal data, Action against trafficking in human beings, and Protection of children against sexual exploitation and sexual abuse. The meeting called for international cooperation and coordinated action to counter cybercrime because of its trans-national dimension. Recommendations pointed to the responsibility of governments in order to raise awareness among Internet users and toward ICANN because of its responsibility for the Domain Name System and controlling illegal online content for the protection of children from Internet pornography.
 Emerging issues: This session identified four key issues that should be addressed in the Forum: (i) Demand and supply side initiatives (by Robert Pepper). He brought into debate the economic concept of demand and supply applied to Internet Governance; (ii) Social, cultural and political issues of Web 2.0 (by Andrew Keen); (iii) Access, particularly in Africa (by Nii Quaynor); and (iv) Innovation, research and development (by Robert Kahn). On the demand side, there were interesting proposals, such as the need for educating through capacity-building Internet users, the ability of people controlling their web ID (part of educating the usage in Internet), local content in local languages (enforcing local community) and improving public policies (but not over regulating, such as prohibiting or limiting access to VoIP, which can suppress the demand). On the supply side, there were the common concern of extending Internet users/access, but also considering "the opportunities created by the release of spectrum through the switch to digital broadcasting were highlighted. Some speakers suggested that such spectrum could be used to support new broadband networks and support new investment and innovative services, while others held the view that this would not be a sustainable solution". Another challenge was to discuss emerging issues in a global forum with different perspectives, for example, developed and developing countries realities; democratic and non-democratic political regimes; etc.
 Taking stock and the way forward: There was a broad agreement that the meeting had been a success; the richness of the debate, the number of workshops, the multi-stakeholder format, the diversity of opinions, the number and range of delegates were all cited as indicators of success. There was clear support for the multi-stakeholder processes and many comments as to how the dialogue of the IGF, freed from the constraints of negotiations and decision-making, allowed for ideas to be freely exchanged and debated. Some concern was expressed that the link between the workshops and the main sessions was not as clear or as strong as could have been expected. Participation from users could be increased and that attention needed to be given to ensuring effective remote participation in the meeting. Some commentators spoke of the need for greater diversity in participation and, for example, the need for greater gender balance on the panels. Also young people needed to be better represented. Development was a key topic of discussion during the Rio Meeting. It will still be an important aspect for future discussion, together with the issue of bridging the digital divide - a key topic for discussion at IGF Hyderabad and one that reflects the theme of the IGF Hyderabad which is "Internet for All."
 Other events: 84 self-organized events took place in parallel to the main sessions: 36 workshops, 23 best practices forums, 11 dynamic coalitions meetings, 8 open forums, and 6 events covering others issues. Of these, 11 were devoted to the issue of openness and freedom of expression, 12 on development and capacity-building, 9 on access, 10 on critical Internet resources, 6 on diversity, 17 on other issues, and 19 were devoted to the issue of security. Of the security sessions 9 spotlighted the issue of the protection of children and child pornography on the Internet.

IGF III — Hyderabad, India 2008 
The third meeting of the IGF was held in Hyderabad, India between 3–6 December 2008. The overall theme for the meeting was "Internet for All". The meeting was held in the aftermath of terrorist attacks in Mumbai. The participants expressed their sympathies to the families of the victims and the Government and the people of India. The five main sessions were organized around the themes: (i) Reaching the next billion, (ii) Promoting cyber-security and trust, (iii) Managing critical Internet resources, (iv) Emerging issues - the Internet of tomorrow, and (v) Taking stock and the way forward. The meeting was attended by 1280 participants from 94 countries.

Opening ceremony / Opening session: During the opening session, nine speakers representing all stakeholder groups addressed the meeting. A common thread through all the speeches was the recognition of the importance of the meeting's overall motto, ‘Internet for All’. It was noted that the Internet was bringing great potential for economic and social benefit to the world. At the same time, speakers also pointed out that there was a need to guard against the problems the Internet could bring when used for harmful purposes. Speakers noted the opportunity the IGF provided for a dialogue between all stakeholders and a mutual exchange of ideas. It allowed to build partnerships and relationships that otherwise might not occur. The IGF was appreciated for its open multi-stakeholder model, with examples of new national and regional IGF initiatives illustrating the spread of the multi-stakeholder ideal and its value in policy discussion.
Reaching the next billion: This session included two panels: (i) Realizing a Multilingual Internet, (ii) Access, Reaching the Next Billions.
Promoting cyber-security and trust: This topic was covered in two panel discussions, one on the ‘Dimensions of Cybersecurity and Cyber-crime’, and the second on ‘Fostering Security, Privacy and Openness’, followed by an open dialogue.
Managing critical Internet resources: This theme was covered in two panel discussions, one on the ‘Transition from IPv4 to IPv6’, and the second on ‘Global, Regional and National Arrangements’. These were followed by an open dialogue.
Emerging issues - the Internet of tomorrow: The goal for this session was to identify important topics that had not been discussed in the IGF to date. The moderator asked the participants to propose and discuss issues the IGF should consider in the next year at the IGF in Egypt and beyond. Suggestions included: growing popularity of social networks and user-generated content, looking at the situation with the last billion in addition to the next billion; impact of policy frameworks on creativity and innovation; the global nature of the Internet on jurisdiction and legislation; challenges to providing an environmentally sustainable Internet; a new multilateral treaty including positive obligations to ensure the ongoing functioning of the Internet; making existing treaties work, rather than creating new treaties; and building trust.
Taking stock and the way forward: This session attempted to address three questions: (i) considering the IGF itself, what should the format and modalities of the Forum be going forward, bearing in mind that the IGF was not a negotiating forum; (ii) suggestions for the 2009 IGF meeting that the MAG should consider in terms of substance of the agenda; and review of the desirability of continuing the IGF beyond its initial five-year mandate.
Closing session: A common thread throughout all the speeches at the closing session was the recognition that the Hyderabad meeting had been a success and that the IGF had proved its usefulness as a space for multi-stakeholder dialogue. Mr. Jainder Singh, Secretary of the Department of Information Technology in the Ministry for Communications and Information Technology of the Government of India, in his closing remarks expressed the gratitude of the people and the Government of India to all participants for coming to Hyderabad and for participating in the Third Meeting of the Internet Governance Forum. By being in Hyderabad in spite of the terrorist acts in Mumbai, participants had demonstrated their solidarity with the people of India in facing this menace. He made the point that the Internet today was standing at a threshold, where both limitless opportunities and daunting threats lied ahead. The challenge was to grab the opportunities and exploit them to the fullest while containing, if not eliminating, the threats. It was clear that achieving these objectives would be possible only by concerted and collaborative action by governments, businesses, civil society organizations and academia. The IGF as a forum held great promise as a platform to forge precisely such a grand coalition for universal good.
Other events: The meeting included 87 other events that ran in parallel to the main sessions: 61 workshops, 9 best practices forums, 10 Dynamic Coalition meetings and 7 open forums. Of the 61 workshops, 8 were devoted to the issue of access, 5 to diversity, 14 to openness, 8 to security, 8 to critical Internet resources, 11 to development and capacity building, and 7 to other issues. Five workshops and other meetings were cancelled following the events in Mumbai. Reports were received from a number of regional and national IGF initiatives, other related events, and other meetings.

IGF IV — Sharm El Sheikh, Egypt 2009 
Egypt hosted the fourth IGF meeting from 15–18 November 2009 in Sharm El Sheikh. The overall theme for the meeting was: "Internet Governance – Creating Opportunities for all". IGF IV marked the beginning of a new multi-stakeholder process. The main sessions on the agenda were (i) Managing critical Internet resources; (ii) Security, openness and privacy; (iii) Access and diversity; (iv) Internet governance in light of the WSIS principles; (v) Taking stock and the way forward: the desirability of the continuation of the forum; and (vi) Emerging Issues: impact of social networks. A key focus of IGF 2009 was encouraging youth participation in Internet Governance issues. 

Opening ceremony / Opening session: In all 20 speakers addressed the participants during the Opening Ceremony and Opening Session. Mr. Sha Zukang, Under-Secretary-General for Economic & Social Affairs explained that the IGF worked through voluntary cooperation, not legal compulsion. IGF participants came to the Forum to discuss, to exchange information and to share best practices with each other. While the IGF did not have decision-making abilities, it informed and inspired those who did. The Under-Secretary-General also reminded the meeting that the Tunis Agenda specifically called on the Secretary-General "to examine the desirability of the continuation of the Forum, in formal consultation with Forum participants, within five years of its creation, and to make recommendations to the UN membership in this regard" and encouraged all participants to contribute fully to the consultations. In his keynote address, Sir Tim Berners-Lee, creator of the World Wide Web and Director of World Wide Web Consortium (W3C) emphasized the importance of a single Web that could be shared and used by all. He noted the importance of the Web to enhance the lives of people with disabilities. He said the W3C championed open standards that were royalty free so they could be openly shared. He also announced the launch of the World Wide Web Foundation, an international, non-profit organization that would strive to advance the Web as a medium that empowered people. A common thread through all the speeches was the endorsement of the IGF as a platform for fostering dialogue. Eleven speakers specifically supported an extension of the IGF mandate. 
Internet governance – Setting the scene: This session was to help newcomers and other participants understand the IGF and to find their way around the programme.
Managing critical Internet resources: The session focused on four main topics: (i) transition from IPv4 to IPv6; (ii) importance of new TLDs and IDNs for development; (iii) affirmation of commitments and the IANA contract and recent developments in the relationship between ICANN and the United States government; enhanced cooperation generally and the internationalization of critical Internet resource management.
Security, openness, and privacy: The importance of privacy was discussed in the light of the new social network phenomenon and the fact that children were the easiest targets since they were at the same time the most vulnerable and most trusting group and the earliest adopters of new technology. It was noted that in addition to the rights to freedom of expression and privacy, that security was also an important right. The problems of establishing a culture of trust, the separation of valid security countermeasures from those that would be established in order to collect data for control and suppression were raised. Another challenge involves contextual integrity in data aggregation, and the role of powerful corporate and national entities in the use and abuse of this data. Another challenge concerned the issue that rights were currently protected by the constitutional nation state, yet people lived in a borderless global network. This means there is a need for a human rights perspective beyond technological and commercial developments. The discussion also touched on anonymity. Eliminating anonymity on the Internet would be very hard, as would designing an Internet architecture that did not permit anonymity. It was also commented that anonymity, as a fundamental property of the Internet, was a social good, a political good, and an economic good.
Access and diversity : Access and diversity can be considered as two sides of the same coin; they are issues that affect hundreds of millions of people not yet involved in the Internet conversation, and of particular concern are diversity in language and diversity concerning disability. Access includes financial access, the relevance of literacy to access, political access which gives voice to linguistic access, and access by the disabled. Desirable access to the Internet is further defined as being connected to the Internet at the right speed, linked to the right content at the right time and place. Issues concerned with infrastructure were now secondary, because advances have been made, specifically with mobile phones and Internet penetration in many parts of the world. Many agreed that progress had been made regarding infrastructure, notably that submarine fibre cable systems had been built and provided increased bandwidth and higher quality connectivity. However, it was noted that landlocked countries still struggled to access coastal Internet cables, and that broadband access was still limited and costs were still high. Spectrum management was identified as a major and a fundamental component of access.
Internet governance in the light of the WSIS principles: The IGF was created as a product of the WSIS, and was mandated by the Tunis Agenda to promote and assess on an ongoing basis the embodiment of the WSIS principles in the Internet governance process. The session was to determine whether the WSIS principles had been taken into consideration in the governance of the Internet. The session was divided into two main segments. The first section concentrated on principles, which were adopted in Geneva and Tunis, and particularly on paragraph 29. The second part was devoted to a debate on how Internet governance influenced the evolution of inclusive, non-discriminatory, development oriented Information Society and made reference to paragraph 31 of the Tunis Agenda. After discussion of many topics, the chair emphasised two main points: (i) that a serious and sincere effort had been made by many to adhere to the WSIS principles in the Internet governance ecosystem, but there was still a lot of work that needed to be done to get everybody on board and to adhere to all of the WSIS principles and (ii) there was a need for more serious engagement of the developing countries in the IGF activities.  The chair made a call on governments from developing countries to get more involved in the IGF activities, to make use of this forum, to get their voice heard, and to get their opinions on the issues related to Internet debated. 
Taking stock and looking forward – on the desirability of the continuation of the Forum: 45 speakers and nine written statements supported a continuation of the Forum. Many speakers emphasized the usefulness of the IGF as a platform for dialogue, free from the pressures of negotiations. A majority of speakers and written submissions supported an extension of the mandate as it is, that is, to continue the IGF as a multi-stakeholder platform that brings people together to discuss issues, exchange information and share best practices, but not to make decisions, nor to have highly visible outputs. The other speakers, while supporting a continuation of the IGF along similar lines to its current form, called for some change, ranging from small operational improvements to major changes in its functioning, such as adding provisions that would allow it to produce outputs, recommendations and decisions on a multi-stakeholder consensus basis, or to finance the IGF through the regular UN budget. Most of those who supported the continuation of the forum would like to do so for at least another five-year term. Two speakers, while welcoming the success of the IGF and not opposing an extension, said it had not met expectations as regards ‘enhanced cooperation’ in the area of Internet governance. They also linked the IGF to unilateral control of critical Internet resource, an issue that needed to be addressed in the future. Egypt, the host country, supported the continuation of the forum, while stressing at the same time the need to review its modalities of work, to increase institutional and financial capacity of its secretariat. The Chairman, Mr. Sha Zukang, Under-Secretary-General for Economic and Social Affairs, concluded the meeting by stating that he would now report back to the Secretary-General on the discussions held in Sharm El Sheikh and the Secretary-General would then make his recommendations to the UN Membership, as requested by the Tunis Agenda.
Emerging issues - Impact of social networks: This session focused on the development of social media and explored whether these developments required the modification of traditional policy approaches, in particular regarding privacy and data protection, rules applicable to user-generated content and copyrighted material, as well as freedom of expression and illegal content.
Closing session: Several speakers, representing all stakeholder groups, addressed the closing session. Common to all the speeches was the recognition that Internet governance needed to be based on multi-stakeholder cooperation. As one speaker pointed out, the lack of multi-stakeholder involvement in the past had often led to ill-informed decision-making. Mr. Sha Zukang, Under-Secretary-General for Economic and Social Affairs, in his concluding remarks stressed the centrality of the principle of inclusiveness and the need for continued discussions on public policy issues related to the Internet.  He recalled that he would present a report to the Secretary-General on the consultation on the desirability of the continuation of the Forum, as mandated by the Tunis Agenda. The Secretary-General would then communicate his recommendations to the UN Membership. All other speakers expressed their support for an extension of the mandate and emphasized the value of the IGF as a platform for multi-stakeholder dialogue. In his concluding address, the Chairman of the Fourth IGF Meeting, Mr. Tarek Kamel, said that he was confident that this message, representing the views of all stakeholders, would be conveyed to the Secretary-General.
Other events: Parallel to the main sessions, more than 100 workshops, best practice forums, dynamic coalition meetings and open forums were held.
Preparing the young generations in the digital age — A shared responsibility: The First Lady of Egypt, H.E. Ms. Suzanne Mubarak, President and Founder of the Suzanne Mubarak Women's International Peace Movement, addressed Forum participants in a special session. Her address focused on youth empowerment, and the safety of children and young people on the Internet. She reminded the Forum that the Internet would continue to be a reflection of the global reality we lived in. As the divisions between transparency and privacy were erased, as the walls between the physical and virtual reality faded away, we would continue to feel reverberations of those challenges on the net through more discrimination, more violence, more instability. And it was for this reason that we should work harder to ensure that the focus of Internet governance became more people-centered, and that the Internet becomes a catalyst for human development. In closing, she outlined her vision of the Internet of tomorrow which held the real promise that we would be able to look at our computer or mobile screens and see a world where people lived in dignity, security and peace. Ms. Hoda Baraka, First Deputy to the Minister of Communications and Information Technology of the Arab Republic of Egypt, then moderated an international panel that commented on the issues raised by the First Lady.
Regional perspectives: Session panelists brought together different regional experiences as they had emerged from various regional and national meetings, discussed how their different priorities were linked, and identified the commonalities and differences of each region. Speakers presenting on the East African and European IGFs noted that they were not held as preparatory meetings for the global IGF, but had independent value, designed to identify local needs and priorities and to seek local solutions. Each regional IGF had a different structure.  The Caribbean IGF held its fifth annual meeting in August, noting it had existed longer than the global meeting. Access, Cybercrime, and cybersecurity were noted as priorities by all the regional representatives. The Latin America and Caribbean as well as the European regional meetings stressed the importance of privacy. Presenters from the floor informed the Forum about national IGF initiatives that had taken place in Spain and the United States. The US meeting also included a youth panel.

IGF V — Vilnius, Lithuania 2010
The fifth IGF meeting was held in Vilnius, Lithuania on 14–17 September 2010. The overall theme for the meeting was "Developing the future together". The meeting was organized around six themes: (i) Internet governance for development, (ii) Emerging issues: cloud computing, (iii) Managing critical Internet resources, (iv) Security, openness, and privacy, (v) Access and diversity, and (vi) Taking stock and the way forward.

Opening ceremony: Mr. Jomo Kwame Sundaram, Assistant Secretary-General for Economic Development at UNDESA noted that while Internet use was increasing, it was growing faster in the developed world than in developing regions and that the digital divide was growing instead of shrinking.
Internet governance for development: This session explored the possible effects of global Internet governance arrangements on the development of the Internet in developing countries. Almost all speakers made it clear that they supported the continuation of the IGF. Several speakers mentioned the importance of ‘the Internet way’, a decentralized open and inclusive multi-stakeholder collaboration that allowed for innovation and creativity at the edges. The importance of maintaining focus on the expansion of the Internet to the billions of users who did not yet have access was emphasized by several speakers. As part of this general theme, it was pointed out that a factor to consider over the coming days was that as the number of Internet users grows worldwide, emerging economies will soon have more Internet users than the European Union and the United States combined.
Emerging issues — Cloud computing: This session provided an overview of the Internet governance considerations related to cloud computing from both the policy and the technical standpoints. Challenges include security, privacy, expense, and differences in policy between countries on what can be done with undisclosed personal data. The assertion was made that the cloud should be protected by the same safe guards against public and private interference as is data today on desktops or local hard drives. Cloud computing was seen as linked to the Internet of things, which was viewed as an emerging issue for future IGF meetings.
Managing critical Internet resources: This session discussed four themes: (i) the status of IPv6 availability around the world, examples and cases; (ii) the internationalization of critical Internet resources management and enhanced cooperation; (iii) the importance of new TLDs and IDNs for development; and (iv) maintaining Internet services in situations of disaster and crisis.
Security, openness, and privacy: This session looked at: (i) issues related to social media, (ii) the nature and characteristics of Internet networks, technologies, and standards, and (iii) international cooperation and collaboration on security, privacy and openness. The point was made by many speakers that new actors had entered the media system so that the traditional means of regulating the media were no longer applicable. Media now included search engines as well as social networks. However, a representative from a social network company said it was a mistake to think the Internet was an unregulated space, when many laws and regulations existed. Online companies had to respect and work with regulators and different authorities on a daily basis. A UNESCO commission report on policy approaches that shaped freedom of expression on the Internet had found that with increased access to information in cyberspace, censorship and filtering was done not only by government, but also by private companies. The Budapest Convention was mentioned as one of the tools that addressed cybercrime standards and norms. It had the force of law and could potentially be applied worldwide and had been drafted with the participation of non-European countries. In closing the paramount importance of making the Internet safe for children and youngsters was noted.
Access and diversity: This session focused on access to infrastructure and access to content and considered a range of issues from geo-location, the global reach of social networks and the linkages between access to knowledge and security solutions, both in terms of hardware and software. the need for continued broadband expansion was seen as crucial by several of the speakers. The importance of inexpensive, but powerful wireless handsets and other devices was also seen as a critical ingredient in achieving global access. The tools that would enable hardware and software developers to develop networks and devices according to universal design principles were also necessary. The biggest drivers on connectivity were poverty, education and geographic location, with people in developing countries less likely to have access than those is developed countries. For a multilingual Internet three things were needed: internationalization of domain names, the availability of local content, and localization of applications and tools. The first of these was in the process of being met with the introduction of IDN ccTLDs, so that Web sites could be named in local scripts and languages. The increase in the use of filters installed to block content considered illegal or harmful was also discussed. The need to balance autonomy with protection of the public good was also raised and it was argued that filtering had a negative impact on access to knowledge, particularly by students.
Taking stock of Internet governance and the way forward: While speakers acknowledged that there was still much work to be done, the discussions had matured and moved from basic explanations to good practices and deployment issues. On some issues like internationalization of critical Internet resources speakers felt that progress had been made. While several speakers talked about the need for a more results oriented IGF, others saw in the IGF practice of not negotiating outcomes one of its strengths, as it allowed for open discussions free from the pressure of negotiations. Several people used the example of the multi-stakeholder dialogue and sharing of information and good practices as proof for the IGF's viability. Papers such as the Inventory of Good Practices that was posted on the IGF Web site shortly before the Vilnius meeting were mentioned as examples of more tangible results. The increased participation of young people in the 2010 IGF meeting was seen as a positive development. In his closing remarks the Session Chair concluded by observing that power is devolving from governments to other actors through interconnected networks and that the IGF is part of this trend.
Closing session: One speaker commented that while the IGF provides a forum for dialogue, it has not yet begun to make recommendations to the organizations involved in Internet governance, as had been the expectation by some at the time of the Tunis Agenda. Before closing the meeting, Mr. Rimvydas Vaštakas, Vice Minister of Transport and Communications of Lithuania said that the Government of Lithuania would make its voice heard in the forthcoming debate of the United Nations General Assembly, adding that it was important to renew the IGF mandate as a platform for non-binding multi-stakeholder dialogue.
Other events: 113 workshops, best practice forums, dynamic coalition meetings and open forums were scheduled in parallel with the main sessions. 
Setting the scene: The objective of this session was to provide participants with the historical context of the IGF and an introduction to the main issues of the Vilnius meeting. The session began with brief presentations by the editor and five of the experts who authored background papers on the principal themes of the meeting.
Regional perspectives: The main aim of this session was to compare the various regional initiatives, to explore their differences, to find commonalities and improve the linkages with the global IGF. Included in the discussion were, the East Africa IGF, West African IGF, Latin America IGF, Caribbean IGF, Asia Pacific Regional IGF, Arabic region IGF, the Pan-European dialogue on Internet governance (EuroDIG), and the Commonwealth IGF.

IGF VI — Nairobi, Kenya 2011
The sixth IGF meeting was held in Nairobi, Kenya on 27–30 September 2011, at the United Nations Office (UNON). The overall theme for the meeting was "Internet as a catalyst for change: access, development, freedoms and innovation". The meeting was organized around the traditional six themes: (i) Internet governance for development, (ii) Emerging issues, (iii) Managing critical Internet resources, (iv) Security, openness, and privacy, (v) Access and diversity, and (vi) Taking stock and the way forward.

 Opening ceremony / Opening session: Ms. Alice Munyua, Chair of the Kenya Internet Governance Steering Committee, highlighted the importance attached to Internet governance for development (IG4D) and expressed the hope that the Internet governance development agenda would permeate all conversations at this sixth meeting of the IGF. She stressed that in keeping with the traditions of the IGF, the meeting outputs would not be formal recommendations, but multi-stakeholder dialogues. These dialogues should inform other international processes and particularly the domestic policy issues of all those concerned with Internet Governance.
 Internet governance for development (IG4D): This session highlighted the significance of Internet governance for development, not as a fringe activity but as a core element of the development agenda linking new forms of access, economic developments, innovations and new freedoms and human rights. The significance of mobile Internet was stressed. The growth in diffusion and adoption of broadband, and hence access to the Internet, has led many to see access to the Internet as a human right; the rights to development and the rights to the Internet are conjoined as the Internet becomes one of the key engines of economic and social transformation and growth so access to the Internet becomes an inalienable human right. An Internet governance framework for development should not only focus on access to infrastructures but also access to freedoms of expression and association.
 Emerging issues: This session focused on the question "Is governance different for the mobile Internet from the wired Internet?" The question is of particular importance to developing countries where the mobile Internet now connects individuals and businesses to services, markets and information previously beyond reach. The mobile Internet must now become more robust, when people are connected they should be protected against the failure of the system they have come to rely on for critical life-effecting services, such as banking, health, and education. The importance of spectrum allocation and management was also recognized. It was noted that the functionality of mobile devices was often locked which seems to make the current mobile Internet a more closed environment than the wired Internet. The audience was asked if this invited less innovation than would be achieved if the mobile environment were more open.
 Managing critical Internet resources: This session was focused on three fundamental issues: (i) the Domain Name System and the role of different stakeholders with specific reference to new gTLDs, (ii) the re-bid of the contract to operate the functions of the Internet Assigned Numbers Authority (IANA), and (iii) the mechanisms to secure and reinforce multi-stakeholder participation in critical Internet resources, especially those stakeholders from emerging economies. Other issues, such as capacity building, and IPv6, were incorporated into the broader discussion.
 Security, openness, and privacy: This session discussed the cross-border Internet governance issues that are encountered at the intersection of security, openness, privacy, and human rights. Concerns were raised about increasing government interventions and regulations and the future implications of instances such as the ‘Arab Spring’ and the wiki-leaks controversy that took place in the last year. It was agreed that the State must be able to protect their citizens, but must also ensure their freedom of expression. Service providers and other intermediaries must all keep user safety and freedom of expression in mind, but must do so with the rule of law in mind and the safety of the users must remain a top priority.
 Access and diversity: This session explored the ways in which access to the Internet can be understood as a human right. There was profound questioning over the difference between ensuring the universality of access to the Internet and the Internet as a human right. Access is inextricably linked with the concept of accessibility. It was observed that there were over 1 billion plus people in the world with disabilities and that many of these are highly vulnerable people with relatively low incomes. As a consequence access without accessibility is meaningless. Affordability is seen as a major barrier to both access and accessibility. It is important to extend the debate beyond issues of connectivity and to also focus on issues such as freedom of expression and freedom of association.
 Taking stock and the way forward: This session reflected on the experiences of the participants and allowed the stakeholders to discuss what went well during the week, what went not as well, and finally, what could and should be done to make the 2012 IGF even better. It was seen as important by many that both the theme of the meeting and the discussions in workshops had adequately incorporated the ideas of Internet Governance for Development. Youth participation needs to be strengthened, both physically and remotely, and youth needed to be included in all aspects of the IGF and at all levels, not only in ‘youth’ centered workshops and sessions. Though holding the Forum in Africa for the first time did increase developing country participation, the inclusion of developing country participants, women, and persons with disabilities, among others, must continue to be strengthened and improved each year.
 Regional dialogues: Regional dialogue sessions were held to inform delegates of the way in which national and regional IGF activities have been addressing key issues, to give participants a cross-regional perspective, and to allow representatives of the regional and national meetings to inform others of concerns and topics beyond those included in the main programme for IGF 2011. The following national and regional groups were represented: East Africa, Uganda, United Kingdom, Commonwealth, West Africa, Asia-Pacific, Europe, Southern Africa, Canada, Russia, Japan, Latin America and the Caribbean, United States, Pacific, Sweden, Rwanda, Central Africa, Finland and the European Youth Forum. Though youth involvement varied among the IGFs present, there was a universal call among all of the IGFs that this involvement needed to increase and that engaging young people in creative and new ways was crucial to the success of the national and regional IGFs. Several common issues among national and regional IGFs were identified, including: cyber-crime, child protection, cross border issues, law enforcement standards and principals, the role of ICT and social networks in particular in natural disasters and social uprisings, cloud computing, mobile technology development, and IPv6 compliance.
 Closing session: The period between the fifth and sixth meetings of the IGF saw tangible examples of the importance of human rights as an integral part of Internet governance agenda, such as during the so-called ‘Arab Spring’. It was suggested that human rights should form the core concept of the theme for the next IGF meeting. Clear and specific calls were made for the host country to inform the United Nations Secretary-General and the General Assembly of the need to ensure that all stakeholders, on an equal and collaborative footing, are integral to any process on the future of Internet governance and that the Tunis Agenda should continue to be the reference point and guide to the responses of the UN to issues of Internet governance.
Other events: 122 workshops, best practise forums, dynamic coalition meetings and open forums were held in parallel with the main sessions. "Feeder" workshops created feedback loops between the main sessions and the different events being held on related subjects.

IGF VII — Baku, Azerbaijan 2012
The seventh IGF meeting was held in Baku, Azerbaijan on 6–9 November 2012. The overall theme for the meeting was: "Internet Governance for Sustainable Human, Economic and Social Development". The meeting was organized around the traditional six themes: (i) Internet governance for development, (ii) Emerging issues, (iii) Managing critical Internet resources, (iv) Security, openness, and privacy, (v) Access and diversity, and (vi) Taking stock and the way forward.

 Opening session: A collective affirmation of the necessity of the multi-stakeholder model in handling Internet governance issues was continually stressed throughout the session. Dr. Hamadoun Touré, Secretary General of the International Telecommunication Union, assured participants that ITU did not want to control the Internet, but rather wanted to re-affirm its commitment to ensuring Internet's sustainability using the multi-stakeholder model. A universal call was made by the speakers to strengthen efforts to ensure the protection of basic human rights and fundamental freedoms in the online world. An underlying message was delivered regarding the importance of putting appropriate regulations in place to assure a safe and secure Internet for young people and the generations to come, while still guaranteeing the basic principles of human rights.
 Internet governance for development (IG4D): This session was divided into three clusters. The first cluster examined the ‘Pending Expansion of the Top Level Domain Space’. The second cluster examined the ‘Enabling Environment’ where panelists explored various ways to attract investment in infrastructure and encourage innovation and growth of ICT services, including mobile technology, while understanding how these technologies can best be employed to address development challenges. The third and final cluster examined Internet infrastructure from developing countries' experiences and how new technologies and the global Internet governance mechanisms address limitations, offer opportunities and enable development. This session highlighted the significance of Internet governance for development, not as a fringe activity but as a core element of the development agenda. An important message to take to the next IGF was to bring more specific case studies and concrete actions to the forum.
 Emerging issues: The first half of the session examined the extent that Internet based services today offer new and radically different opportunities to help families, social groups, communities and broader structures in society organize and re-organize themselves when challenged by natural disaster or strife. The second half of the session explored a range of questions and issues related to the free flow of information, freedom of expression, and other human rights and fundamental freedoms and their respective balances with intellectual property rights. New regulations might not be necessary to provide improved privacy and safety, as consumer protection laws are already in place in many parts of the world. These existing laws together with education and outreach to new consumers of online content, especially those using mobile devices, was said to be crucial in assuring privacy and safety. It was agreed that certain new cyber-threats such as identity theft needed special attention and innovative regulatory and legal policy solutions.
 Managing critical Internet resources: This session focused on three main issues: (i) the initial round of applications in ICANN's New gTLD Program; (ii) proposals for the development of secondary markets for IP addresses; and (iii) issues raised by Internet-related proposals for the revision of the International Telecommunication Regulations at the upcoming World Conference on International Telecommunications (WCIT). The WCIT is a conference organized by the International Telecommunication Union (ITU) to discuss the modification of the International Telecommunication Regulations (ITRs). The WCIT negotiations will not be multi-stakeholder, as only governments can speak and will vote on the outcomes. The process is not well understood by many in the ICT sector, but had recently received a lot of publicity suggesting current Internet operational and governance models might be under threat. The session broadly agreed that adoption of some of the national proposals for revision of the ITRs would constitute a form of global Internet governance and could negatively impact the Internet.
 Security, openness, and privacy: This session examined and questioned a wide range of rapidly emerging controversial issues relevant to and impacting online and offline security, privacy, and notions of identity as they relate to concepts of human rights and fundamental freedoms. There are no easy answers here, other than education was absolutely essential. Internet users of all ages need to be trained on the risks of going online, on the basic human responsibilities, and on the fact that the same un-written rules of how we should treat one another offline should also apply online. A conclusion that emerged was that the inclusion of youth in formulating policies on all Internet governance issues was absolutely essential.
 Access and diversity: This session addressed five main topics: (i) infrastructure, (ii) the mobile Internet and innovation, (iii) human empowerment, (iv) the free flow of information, and (v) multilingualism. The session chair presented research findings that a 10% increase in broadband penetration can lead to a 3.2 per cent increase in a county's GDP, along with a 2 per cent productivity increase. She noted that broadband Internet can play an important role in boosting the economy of a country as well as the well being of citizens.
 Taking stock and the way forward: This session reflected on the experiences of the participants at the IGF 2012 and allowed the stakeholders to discuss observations and conclusions stemming from the workshops and main sessions that took place in Baku. Speakers from all stakeholder groups recommended that the IGF should be used to advance the work done over the past year in other fora to advance discussions on enhanced cooperation. The pending recommendations of the CSTD working group on improvements to the IGF were brought up as a point of guidance for improving and planning future meetings. Integrating the discussions of the national and regional IGF initiatives into the annual meetings should also be priority, as a means to capture the activity of the broader IGF community that takes place between the annual global gatherings. Recent initiatives by various government and non-government actors to set principles and new frameworks and the both positive and negative implications that such initiatives might have were discussed. Delegates counted more than 25 different sets of principles that exist in some form or another, as proposals or drafts, some coming from groups of states, others unilaterally. Some are proposed by organizations like the OECD or Council of Europe, some represent government-led initiatives such as Brazil's multi-stakeholder developed Internet Bill of Rights, and others are developed by civil society organizations. It was mostly agreed that the IGF should continue its role as a non-binding discussion platform, but it was emphasized that the discussions and the trending topics of the annual meeting should be documented and disseminated into other Internet governance fora in a more effective way.
Closing session: The speakers noted that the IGF had successfully evolved and progressed from previous years. Speakers made reference to other upcoming international high-level gatherings where Internet governance policy issues will be discussed and existing frameworks and regulatory measures will be reviewed. A strong call was made by the civil society representative for the IGF to continue to be a forum that promotes human rights and fundamental freedoms on the Internet. Representatives of the Internet and business communities emphasized the importance of the multi-stakeholder, bottom-up Internet governance model to ensure that the Internet fairly advances social and economic development around the world.
Other events: A record number of workshops, dynamic coalition meetings, open fora, and other events were held in parallel with the main sessions. The topics addressed ranged from issues related to cyber-security and child protection online, the rise of social networks, the use of ‘big data’ and various aspects of human rights as they related to the Internet, among many others.
Other events: A record number of workshops, dynamic coalition meetings, open fora and other events were held in parallel with the main sessions. Topics ranged from issues related to cybersecurity and child protection online, the rise of social networks, the use of ‘big data’, and various aspects of human rights as they related to the Internet, among many others.

IGF VIII — Bali, Indonesia 2013
The eighth IGF meeting was held in Bali, Indonesia from 22 to 25 October 2013. 135 focus sessions, workshops, open forums, flash sessions, and other meetings took place over the 4 day event. The overarching theme for meeting was: "Building Bridges - Enhancing Multistakeholder Cooperation for Growth and Sustainable Development". The meeting was organized around six sub-themes: (i) Access and Diversity - Internet as an engine for growth and sustainable development; (ii) Openness - Human rights, freedom of expression and free flow of information on the Internet; (iii) Security - Legal and other frameworks: spam, hacking and cyber-crime; (iv) Enhanced cooperation; (v) Principles of multi-stakeholder cooperation; (vi) Internet governance principles. In the context of the recent revelations about government-led Internet surveillance activities, IGF 2013 was marked by many discussions about the need to ensure better protection of all citizens in the online environment and to reach a proper balance between actions driven by national security concerns and the respect for internationally recognized human rights, such as the right to privacy and freedom of expression.

An elephant in the room — Government-led Internet surveillance: In the context of the recent revelations about government-led Internet surveillance activities, IGF 2013 was marked by many discussions about the need to ensure better protection of all citizens in the online environment and to reach a proper balance between actions driven by national security concerns and the respect for internationally recognized human rights, such as the right to privacy and freedom of expression. Several focus sessions and workshops touched upon these issues and focused on the need to rebuild the trust of Internet users, which has been seriously affected by these actions. It was underlined throughout the week that any Internet surveillance practices motivated by security concerns should only happen within a truly democratic framework, ensuring their adequacy, proportionality, due process, and judicial oversight.
Opening ceremony and session: Mr. Thomas Gass, Assistant Secretary-General for Policy Coordination and Inter-Agency Affairs of the United Nations Department of Economic and Social Affairs (UN DESA), formally opened the 8th Internet Governance Forum (IGF). Mr. Gass stressed that the United Nations Secretary General was committed to the multistakeholder model for Internet governance championed by the IGF and the long-term sustainability of the forum, with the hope that the forum's mandate would be extended beyond 2015 when the broader WSIS review process will be taking place. Mr. Gass emphasized the importance of ensuring that our global Internet is one that promotes peace and security, enables development and ensures human rights. As the international community strives to accelerate the achievement of the Millennium Development Goals by 2015, and as it shapes the Post-2015 Development Agenda that focuses on sustainable development, expanding the benefits of ICTs, through a global, inter-operable and robust Internet, will be crucial.

H.E. Tifatul Sembiring, Minister of Communications and Information Technology (MCIT), of the Republic of Indonesia, assumed the chairmanship of the meeting and welcomed all participants to Indonesia and the island of Bali. In a video address, Mr. Hamadoun Touré, Secretary-General of the International Telecommunication Union (ITU), stressed that from the beginning, ITU has been firmly committed to the IGF, which he said was a great example of multistakeholder action. The Secretary-General also encouraged the IGF stakeholders to join the many World Summit on the Information Society (WSIS) review activities that the ITU was spearheading over the next year. The representative from Brazil invited IGF stakeholders to participate in a "summit" focused on Internet governance issues to be held in the first half of 2014.

Role of governments in multistakeholder cooperation: A panel discussion of the role of governments in multistakeholder cooperation on Internet governance issues. The chair explained that the session topic was inspired by a formal International Telecommunication Union (ITU) opinion on the Role of Governments proposed by the Government of Brazil at the World Telecommunications Policy Forum (WTPF) in Geneva in May 2013. It was underlined that while the concept of multistakeholder cooperation is widely recognized as a vital feature of Internet policy processes, Brazil's intervention at the WTPF was intended to remind everyone that the roles and responsibilities of different stakeholders, particularly of governments, were far from well understood or agreed.

A panelist noted in his introductory remarks that Brazil's WTPF opinion prompted serious reconsideration by many stakeholders. He noted that his own government's deliberations after WTPF came up with four areas where government played an important role. As the morning's discussion continued these four areas of government activity were reinforced by both the panel and audience, and were met with broad support:

 Government enables and facilitates the building of ICT infrastructure and the development of competition frameworks and policies that supported private sector investment.
 Government creates domestic legal frameworks that are intended to legally reinforce the idea that what is illegal offline is also illegal online. As the legal frameworks have to be updated in order to keep them consistent with the evolution of the Internet, partnerships with the private sector and civil society are needed in order to make such reviews possible and to address the challenges of a top-down legislation which may prove to be too slow, unwieldy, and bureaucratic. By working together, all stakeholders are able to develop more comprehensive public policy concerning the Internet.
 Government, among other stakeholders, plays an important role in preserving free expression, cultural diversity, and gender equality on the Internet, and in supporting people's ability to access and engage with the Internet, through support for education and skills development. A panelist noted that a human rights framework underpins our use of the Internet and our access to it, and governments should be the guardians of these global commitments, a statement agreed to by many in the discussion.
 Government can help to support the multistakeholder process and partnerships, but are not the leaders of it. The example of the Brazilian Internet Steering Committee (CGI.br) was mentioned by both panelists and members of the audience as a successful example of such a partnership. It was recognized that governments often have a careful role to play in balancing competing interests in policy processes. The aim is to achieve bottom-up, transparent and inclusive Internet Governance related decision-making processes where governments work in genuine partnership with all stakeholders.

One area where governments have an especially important role to play is the area of human rights. Indeed, government has a responsibility and duty to protect human rights, including freedom of expression. Not only was this not contested in the room, it clearly found broad support. It was noted that human rights issues were not on the IGF agenda seven years ago, but have emerged as a fundamental issue in current Internet governance discussions. The issue of government surveillance was raised by a number of members of the audience, and there was broad recognition from the panel that governments should 'practice what they preach' when talking about openness and transparency on the Internet. It was felt by many that we have seen trust in the Internet significantly eroded by recent events.

There was agreement that the evolution of the different parts of the overall system for Internet governance must continue, and a number of participants mentioned the recent Montevideo Statement on the Future of Internet Cooperation from leading Internet technical organizations. There was agreement on and support for a greater and clearer role for governments, but it was emphasized that this increased role should not be at the expense of other actors' contribution. Governments must not push others from the tent.

A speaker suggested that the IGF might become a policy equivalent to the bottom-up IETF, which produces Internet technical standards. This idea was met with some agreement; however, it was noted that if this were to be our goal, we should be ready to add a layer that allows the IGF to actually draft policy documents. Currently, the IGF does not create anything like Internet drafts and RFCs.

This discussion remains open and is being dealt with by a dedicated working group on enhanced cooperation convened by the UN's Commission on Science and Technology for Development (CSTD) .

Internet governance principles: This session was organized with invited experts and audience members seated in a roundtable format with moderated discussion. The session had three aims:
 To provide an overview of the principles developed and adopted by various governmental and non-governmental groups over the past few years;
 To discuss the similarities, overlaps, areas of consensus, differences and disagreements with regard to those various principles; and
To develop ideas for moving towards a common framework of multistakeholder principles based on the existing initiatives and projects.

The moderators noted that in preparing for the session they had found a high degree of commonality (perhaps 80%) in the more than 25 documents, declarations, resolutions and statements that they had identified which defined principles for Internet governance. 
 Beginning the discussion, the Organisation for Economic Co-operation and Development (OECD) noted three key principles from an overall package of 14 that had been agreed by the OECD Council. They are openness, flexibility, and a multistakeholder approach. The Council also noted that Internet policy must be grounded in respect for human rights and the rule of law. However, given the special role of governments in some policy areas such as security and stability and critical infrastructure, these areas could not be left to the private sector and civil society alone. 
 The Council of Europe also emphasized the need for respect for human rights and the rule of law, for multistakeholder governance arrangements and the equal and full participation of all stakeholders. In all, member states of the Council of Europe had agreed to a package of ten principles. 
 The Seoul Conference on Cyberspace, which took place the weekend before IGF 2013, noted that progress had been made towards agreeing on principles and widely accepted norms for behavior in cyberspace, but we had still not reached agreement on international "rules of the road" or a set of standards of behavior. The Chairman of the Seoul Conference noted that differences of emphasis remain on how to reconcile and accommodate different national legal practices, policies and processes. However, the 87 countries that were in Seoul adopted the Seoul Framework and that in itself is an important step. 
 The IGF Dynamic Coalition of Internet Rights and Principles introduced a document they had produced as a Charter of Human Rights. The Charter has twenty-one clauses based on ten broad principles that summarize the intent of the Charter: universality, accessibility, neutrality, freedom of expression, life, liberty and security, privacy, diversity, standards and regulation and governance. The Charter is a live document, still undergoing changes.
 A speaker from Brazil noted how the principles developed by the CGI.br, the multistakeholder body responsible for the Internet policy and governance activities in the country, were now close to being adopted as part of proposed legislation. The legislation, "Marco Civil da Internet", guarantees civil rights online and in the use of the Internet.
 The session heard about Open Stand, a set of principles developed to guide global Internet standards activities. They were developed after discussion between the IEEE, IETF, IAB, and ISOC as a new concept, in contrast to some of the more inter-governmental models that currently exist. The principles are based on respectful cooperation, specifically between standards organizations, each respecting the autonomy, integrity, processes and intellectual property rights of the other organizations. The principles support interoperability at all levels.
 A government representative responded to these various examples from Internet principles projects noting that Internet governance should promote international peace, sustainable development and shared understanding and cooperation. He reminded the session that there are two types of human rights: civil and political rights; and economic, social, and cultural rights. The right to development is essential to Internet governance.

There was widespread support for the principles mentioned by various panelists, but there were also notes of caution. For example, one person mentioned that these principles must reflect national principles, norms and culture and not be imposed from outside. As an example, it was noted that the African Union Cybercrime Convention makes references to human rights, but also proposes the criminalization of any blasphemous speech. Having a set of broadly agreed multistakeholder principles is not the end of the road, but a starting point for further work. As a final question, panellists were asked if they and their organizations involved in producing their respective principles proposals would be willing to come together under the umbrella of the IGF to create a coherent global set of principles. The answer was a resounding "Yes".

Principles of multistakeholder cooperation: This session was organized as an open discussion facilitated by the two moderators with no designated panelists, just interaction with the audience. The goal of the session was to explore and work towards key principles which should be the basis of a multistakeholder forum or policy making process. The moderators introduced the work of the "IGF Working Group on multistakeholder principles" which had looked at the many principles documents, etc., developed by various international processes. From these the coalition compiled a set of key common principles which were introduced as the basis for discussion:
 Open and inclusive processes.
 Engagement, which was described as processes that enabled all stakeholders to engage and to participate.
 Participation and contribution, described as the ability to participate in and contribute to decision making.
 Transparency in processes and decision making and how decisions made and input is reflected.
 Accountability, described as mechanisms for checks and balances in decision making, and
 Consensus-based approaches for decision making that should reflect how input from the multistakeholder processes are incorporated.

These were not suggested as the only principles, or as principles that could not be challenged, but they had been identified as common among the many principles documents reviewed. Throughout the session, speakers from different stakeholder groups endorsed these core principles either as being central to statements they had developed or as having been an integral part of the discussions they had held on multistakeholder cooperation. An important note of caution was raised by a speaker who reminded the session that these new processes were not a replacement for established democratic processes and representation of the public interest. The appropriate instruments of democracy must be maintained. Another discussant noted that while principles were an important guide, they should remain flexible and able to adapt: not become rules, where we might risk transparency and inclusiveness and responsiveness to changing situations. The U.K. recently established a "Multistakeholder Advisory Group on Internet Governance" called MAGIG, composed of approximately 40 representatives from across the administration that addresses Internet issues and representatives of appropriate stakeholders.

The discussion suggested that there was consensus on the broad set of principles, with some notes of caution, noting the imperative of diversity and geographical representation, the need for common language, and a common understanding of how those principles can be implemented and work in practice. Considering the way forward, the session heard a comment that it was necessary to look at actual practices and how those can be mapped to the principles, how are principles being followed and in multistakeholder processes. The IGF WG on Multistakeholder Principles will continue to work towards identifying key multistakeholder principles and best practices in their implementation, and look forward to further inputs from all stakeholders.

Security, legal and other frameworks — spam, hacking and cyber-crime: This session aimed to produce clear takeaways on legal and other frameworks for addressing the controversial problems of spam, hacking, and cyber-crime at local, regional, national, and global levels. This session carried forward some of the critical concerns with spam that were raised at WCIT-12 in Dubai last year as well as problems countries face with understanding the complexity of cyber hacking, cybersecurity, and cyber-crime.

The first part of the discussion examined spam and its emerging challenges and opportunities for capacity building to exchange expertise on mitigation and prevention with countries and communities who are interested in establishing spam mitigation initiatives. Participants in the meeting and following remotely examined the roles that the multistakeholder community plays in possible technical solutions and examples of sound regulatory approaches, need for legal frameworks and law enforcement responses that are necessary to address the growing issue of spam in particular in developing countries. There was consensus of the participants that while spam may be ill defined as unwanted or unsolicited electronic communication or email, it is the delivery mechanism whereby malware, botnets, and phishing attacks infect unsuspecting users. Cooperation amongst all responsible actors for prevention of such acts as well as the importance of public private partnerships and cross-border synergy amongst governments, the technical community, the private sector, and law enforcement was noted in the work being performed in industry groups. The work of the Internet Society's Combating Spam Project to bring together technical experts and organizations such as Messaging Anti-Abuse Working Group (MAAWG), the London Action Plan, and within the GSMA to work with developing countries to address from a global perspective the ever-shifting nature of spam attacks.

The second part of the discussion addressed the inherent fear and lack of trust in the Internet that exists in many parts of the world. While the media often paints an optimistic picture of the potential for economic and social growth that the Internet holds, in many developing countries this is simply not the case. Many users there are hesitant to communicate and innovate online because of the prevalence of spam and the threat of hacking and cyber-crime. A participant from a small island developing state explained how his country is now a prime target for malicious online activity as an example of the risk they are facing. In this regard the sharing of best practices and capacity building activities were seen as being extremely important in helping to prevent spam, hacking and cyber-crime in these recently connected areas of the world. It was noted and agreed by the participants that producing data and statistics to measure the scope of the problem in these areas was said to be of great importance to identifying the areas of need.

The Messaging Anti-Abuse Working Group (MAAWG) and the London Action Plan (LAP) were both mentioned as strong multistakeholder global initiatives that are working actively on prevention measures for harmful activities on the web. The Budapest Convention on Cyber-Crime was also said to be a strong starting point and groundwork for international cooperation efforts. The IETF is heavily involved in work related to securing networks and in implementing the proper infrastructure. Computer Emergency Response Teams (CERTs) on the national level have been very helpful in both prevention efforts and in mitigating the effects of harmful attacks after the fact. Many emphasized the need to strike a balance between keeping the Internet both open and secure. Efforts to secure networks should not stifle innovation by fragmenting network flows of information.

Access/Diversity — Internet as an engine for growth and sustainable development: The session discussed how the World Summit on the Information Society (WSIS) decisions could feed into a review of Millennium Development Goals (MDGs), and how technology could become an integral part of post-2015 Sustainable Development agenda. The chair and moderator reminded participants that October 24 is UN day so it was an appropriate day to discuss the Millennium Development Goals (MDGs), WSIS goals, and the correlation and interplay between them. 2015 is an important year, as it is when the international community will review its progress towards the achieving the goals adopted at the Millennium Summit in 2000. It also marks WSIS +10, which will entail an evaluation of the action lines adopted at Tunis in 2005.

The session began with a presentation on Indonesia's response and implementation of the MDGs. Discussion reviewed Indonesia's successes and also areas where more hard work was required, such as in lowering the rates of infant and maternal mortality. The speaker introduced the post-2015 Sustainable Development agenda and the three pillars the agenda proposes: economic development, social inclusion, and environmental sustainability. The next presenter, joining the session remotely, provided a history of the MDGs, describing the implementation of some of the issues and the development of the Sustainable Development goals, which are set to become the main conceptual framework for development in the 21st century. He stated that collaboration across all sectors involved in the wider development process would help deliver the agenda while working in silos would not; this was met with strong agreement. A video was shown reminding the audience that the MDGs are really about people, and shared real examples of development activities that have been enabled by the Internet or made much more effective by the Internet.

A number of speakers and members of the audience noted the limited reference to technology in the MDGs and that this must be updated in future international goals to reflect the ever-increasing importance of Information and communications technologies (ICTs) in development. The meeting agreed that the benefits of ICTs were cross-cutting. ICTs are general purpose technologies, which makes them enabling technologies much as the combustion engine or power generation enabled whole sectors to develop. Work produced by the UN Broadband Commission suggests that when governments act alone implementation tends to move more slowly and with less innovation than if the private sector and others were involved. Similarly, when broadband roll-out is left strictly to the private sector there are gaps that are not filled. A presenter commented that he had been told that the successor document to the MDGs included only two references to the Internet. There was a tendency within governments for the departments responsible for ICT policy to be different from those responsible for WSIS and UN arrangements and they did not necessarily communicate.

The session moved on to the goal of making recommendations to fulfill the aims of the WSIS and to make the connection to the broader Sustainable Development Goals, as both processes were to be reviewed in 2015. The Sustainable Development Goals Working Group will produce goals on water, energy, jobs, education and health. Gender is expected to be a goal or to be cross-cutting, and there might be other topics such as oceans, forests, peace and security. The session noted the importance of how ICTs will be included in the development of these global goals. A speaker noted the value of data collection, and how information about the full impact of the Internet, for instance, in the sharing economy that has developed, the caring economy and the app economy, are not being properly captured, documented and quantified in terms of the benefits they produce. The panel agreed on the significant value of improved data gathering and dissemination. Another speaker noted the importance of other infrastructures, particularly power, that are platforms essential to providing ICTs. Another participant commented on the need to share best practices, the need to communicate what works and past successes. The session was informed of a potential repository of materials from IGFs, regional events and other fora, a new initiative called "Friends of IGF". Launched this year in Bali, the Friends of IGF website project has collected the conversations, video, transcripts, presentations and other materials that have happened at IGFs over the past few years and has made it all available in one place. Such a site might be a very useful shared resource. At the Seoul Cyberspace Conference earlier in October, the U.K. government presented a 'next steps' paper which attempted to generate greater consensus around Internet governance principles and how they should lead into model policies as part of a global capacity building agenda.

A mind-map of the different topics, challenges and possible solutions was created during the session to provide a visual overview of the dialog. A key conclusion was that there is a need to strengthen ICT's presence within the post-2015 process, particularly the Sustainable Development Goals. Two clear takeaways from the session were the need to promote the collection and dissemination of new data and to share success stories and good practices. An important lesson from the MDG process was the need to be more concrete in the formulation of goals, so as to be able to measure progress. It must be made clear that money goes where the goals are, and that when targets are not met there must be transparency about the outcome. Important questions were raised about data collection and how best to collect, analyze and share data in the future. This area, amongst others, is somewhere where the Internet has clear strengths and where it can contribute to accomplishment of the wider development objective.

Human rights, freedom of expression, and the free flow of information on the Internet: To the pleasure of many participants, for the first time in the history of the IGF a dedicated plenary session focused on human rights, freedom of expression and the free flow of information on the Internet. The highly interactive roundtable discussion touched upon many of the key issues addressed in the related workshops prior to the session. Access to and use of the Internet from a human rights perspective were at the forefront of discussions. Key points were made related to a wide range of violations of rights and particular groups being affected, including journalists, human rights defenders, and sexual rights activists. The ways in which Governments have responded with legislation to challenges posed by the Internet, as well as new jurisprudence, new case law, and new forms of defamation, were also discussed throughout the proceedings. One commonality in the discussions was the desire to connect openness in Internet standards with that for "reasonable limitations online". Some fascinating regional perspectives provided depth and scope to the broader discussions.

Speakers addressed emerging issues and concerns that include civil suits against individuals for Twitter expression. Another source of concern, especially for speakers from developing countries, are copyright suits by technology providers that are seen as "overriding protections provided by the law", with one speaker describing the enforcement of copyright as limiting people's access to essential knowledge. "Unbalanced copyright frameworks" were also described from the perspective of public library service providers, with one speaker saying that licensing systems of the digital age are bringing restrictions that "end up defeating the purposes of the Internet", as sometimes the public can only access information that public library systems "can afford to pay for". Others warned of setting up a false dichotomy between copyright and freedom of expression.

One speaker reported back from a vibrant workshop on the popular issue of Net Neutrality. The workshop agreed that openness and neutrality are essential features of the Internet that have to be fostered to ensure the free flow of information. They also agreed that both openness and neutrality are the features that make the Internet a key driver for innovation, as well as a great human rights enabler. Finally they agreed that at present, there are some traffic management techniques that can jeopardize this open and neutral architecture and can have negative effects on human rights and thus net neutrality should not be considered just from a competition perspective, but also from a human rights perspective.

Finally, everyone in the session agreed that human rights and freedom of expression online should remain high atop the growing list of issues central to the ongoing IGF discussions. Some key takeaways and next steps from the session‟s rapporteur are attached to the IGF chair's summary as an annex.

Emerging Issues – Internet Surveillance: In response to the high level of interest generated by recent revelations about extensive Internet surveillance programs in different countries, the traditional IGF emerging issues session addressed in depth the hot topic of Internet surveillance. Two moderators introduced a panel of five presenters and four commenters and proposed to address the community policy questions in five main baskets:
 Infrastructure and the basic functionality of the Internet
 Privacy protection and the other human rights issues related to the Internet surveillance
 Focus on security, and situations when surveillance is justified and under what conditions
 Data protection and the economic concerns
 Ethics and the potential impact of surveillance on trust in the Internet.
The moderator suggested issues of law enforcement procedures and international law would underlie many of the discussions.

In their opening remarks all the panelists noted the severity of the problem and its importance to the international community. In response to the many reports of U.S. intelligence gathering practices, the session heard that the U.S. administration, directed by the President, had begun processes of extensive reviews and reforms. Some participants noted the difference between gathering information for intelligence and security purposes and intelligence collection for the purpose of repression and persecution of citizens.

A speaker providing a U.S. business perspective stated that his company, in common with other ICT companies effected by government requests to access and monitor user data, did not accept blanket requests for access. However, they were subject to the rule of law and treated each individual request from the government on its merits. He also commented that surveillance revelations were a major problem for the Internet industry; if users didn't trust a company's products they would go elsewhere. A comment from a remote participant referred to reports that U.S. cloud companies can expect to lose business from non-U.S. customers to the tune of many billions of dollars, with the overall negative impact on the IT industry even greater because of this loss of trust. A speaker from the Internet technical community echoed these concerns about the loss of trust in Internet products and services. He pointed out that there was an understanding that intelligence activities targeted individuals and groups, but the very large scale of the alleged monitoring shocked and surprised many. This observation about the massive scale of the monitoring was shared by many, and led to questions about the central role of a single country in many aspects of the Internet; from the control of infrastructure and the success and global spread of commercial services, to positions of oversight over critical Internet functions. Concern over these issues was one of the motivations behind the proposed Internet governance summit to be held in Brazil in May 2014. A commenter noted that Brazil intends for the meeting to be a "Summit" in the sense that it will be high level and will have authority enough to make decisions.

Comments about building more Internet exchange points and adding more connectivity also received support. Keeping traffic local would avoid transiting networks that might be monitored, and they would increase speed, lower costs and enable local Internet businesses to grow. Open source solutions were mentioned as being useful to assure users about the reliability of the tools they used, and additional efforts with open source would be worth pursuing. Any response that tried to create national or regional Internets would risk fragmenting the Internet and most likely harm opportunities for innovation. A global and open Internet is still needed.

Open microphone session: To wrap up the IGF an open microphone session was held to provide an opportunity for all participants to address any issue of their concern, allowing the Multistakeholder Advisory Group (MAG) to receive feedback from participants in regards to the proceedings that took place throughout the week. The MAG and the IGF Secretariat will take note of all comments made during the session as well as comments received from an open call for comments on the 8th IGF and take them into account when planning future meetings.

There was an interesting discussion about the value of the IGF for government stakeholders in particular. Government representatives spoke about how the IGF teaches them how the multistakeholder model can be strengthened and further developed, how the Internet can be used to benefit developing countries, and lessons about the importance of respecting human rights and freedom of expression both online and offline. It is a useful platform where governments can interact with all other stakeholder groups.

The importance of continued outreach to new stakeholders about the IGF process was stressed. Links to important media outlets should be strengthened to improve the forum’s global visibility and reach. Capacity building opportunities and e-participation at the IGF events need to continue to improve to attract new stakeholders.

Closing ceremony and session: Many speakers praised the IGF for its significant progress in ‘evolving’ in-step with other Internet governance processes. A number of steps were taken in the preparatory process, in-line with the recommendations of the CSTD working group, to ensure this. It was emphasized that the broad support received for the 8th IGF needed to be catalyzed to bring increased stable and sustainable funding and overall support for the IGF Secretariat.

Three important announcements were made by the governments of Turkey, Brazil, and Mexico to close the meeting. Representatives from each country announced their intentions to host future IGF meetings; in Turkey in 2014, Brazil in 2015 and in Mexico in 2016. Mexico’s announcement was of course contingent on the mandate of the IGF being extended beyond its second 5-year mandate which will end in 2015.

IGF IX — Istanbul, Turkey 2014
The ninth IGF meeting was held in Istanbul, Turkey from 2 to 5 September 2014. The meeting included 135 sessions and 14 pre-events. The overarching theme for meeting was: "Connecting Continents for Enhanced Multi-stakeholder Internet Governance". The meeting was organized around eight sub-themes: (i) Policies Enabling Access; (ii) Content Creation, Dissemination and Use; (iii) Internet as an Engine for Growth and Development; (iv) IGF and The Future of the Internet Ecosystem; (v) Enhancing Digital Trust; (vi) Internet and Human Rights; (vii) Critical Internet Resources; and (viii) Emerging Issues.

 Opening ceremony and session: Mr. Thomas Gass, Assistant Secretary-General for Policy Coordination and Inter-Agency Affairs of United Nations Department of Economic and Social Affairs (UNDESA), formally opened the ninth IGF. Mr. Gass stressed that the United Nations Secretary General was committed to the multistakeholder model for Internet governance championed by the IGF and the long-term sustainability of the forum. Lütfi Elvan, Minister of Transport, Maritime Affairs and Communications of the Republic of Turkey, assumed the role of chair of the meeting and welcomed all participants. Mr. Elvan, suggested an "Internet Universal Declaration" be prepared in a multistakeholder fashion as an additional concrete output of the IGF. After his speech, Mr. Elvan conveyed the role of chair to Mr. Tayfun Acarer, Chairman of the Board and President of the Information and Communication Technologies Authority (ICTA) of the Republic of Turkey. Mr. Acarer expressed his appreciation for the opportunity to host the ninth IGF in Istanbul and stressed the importance of enabling access to information resources in helping to bridge the digital divide. Many speakers made an urgent call to strengthen the IGF and provide it with further financial and political sustainability to safeguard the progress that has been made in creating an ecosystem where the Internet can go on flourishing in the future. Mr. Virgilio Fernandes Almeida, National Secretary for Information Technology Policies at the Brazilian Ministry of Science and Technology, invited all participants to the tenth IGF in 2015 hosted by Brazil.
 Policies Enabling Access, Growth and Development on the Internet: There were 1 billion Internet users when the Tunis Agenda was adopted, in 2005. Nine years later, there are approx. 7 billion mobile subscriptions and approx. 3 billion Internet users. Home Internet access is near saturation in developed countries, but only 31% in developing countries. Public Internet access, infrastructure sharing and access as a human right for the socially disadvantaged, vulnerable sections and persons with disabilities are critical access issues – that need global attention. The session was conducted as a roundtable with 22 invited speakers, with 13 from developing countries and two from international organizations. Nearly half the participants were women. Highlights of the interactive discussion included:
 Many stressed that the concerns over Internet access and inclusivity go beyond connectivity and infrastructure issues and must incorporate the role of social inclusion in the debate, including users with disabilities and marginalized groups.
 One speaker noted that there is an important and complex relationship between access to networks, the development of local content and information knowledge flows. This was echoed in comments from the floor, which acknowledged that there was a strong correlation between growth in local content and the development of network infrastructure, and that open government and open data policies around the world provided strong examples of how developers in the public arena are able to leverage the public to generate new information society services. The need to place more emphasis on multilingualism online was also acknowledged by the panel.
 Local and small enterprises need to be involved in policy discussions. One speaker also noted that the significance of youth empowerment in the policy formation debate is imperative in spurring economic and social development.
 The importance of standardizing how access levels are calculated was noted. It was suggested that an action to take from the session is to do more work looking at the different methodologies for calculating access levels and providing more transparency for these debates.
 Digital competencies and media literacy were seen by many participants as essential to Internet growth. 
 It was agreed that the involvement of governments in promoting and supporting infrastructure expansion through planning was imperative; however, there were differences in opinion about how the implementation of these plans should be monitored.
 Network Neutrality: Towards a Common Understanding of a Complex Issue: Network neutrality was one of the most polemic issues, as was also witnessed at NETmundial in April 2014. At NETmundial there were "diverging views as to whether or not to include the specific term as a principle in the outcomes". However, NETmundial participants agreed on the need to continue the discussion regarding network neutrality and recommended this discussion "be addressed at forums such as the IGF". The session looked at the issue from different perspectives – technical, economic, social and human rights as well as two cross-cutting perspectives, developmental and regulatory. The discussions showed that all these issues are intertwined and multifaceted. Given the differences between developing and developed country perspectives, there was a sense that the search for a one-size fits all policy solution would not be the best way to proceed globally. While there was a divergence of views on many issues, such as the concept of appropriate network management, the impact on innovation or zero-rating, there were also convergence of views on the importance of enhancing users’ experience or the need to avoid the blocking of legal content. The Dynamic Coalition on Network Neutrality will continue the discussions leading up to the 2015 meeting, but the view was also held that there was a need to develop a process that allowed the entire IGF community to weigh in and validate the findings of the Dynamic Coalition.
 Evolution of the Internet Governance Ecosystem and the Role of the IGF: As the Internet continues to grow and its benefits reach more people, more stakeholders are entering the Internet governance debates, with the aim to address concerns they have about the use and potential misuse of the Internet. Existing organizations, such as UN agencies, upon request by the governments, examine their roles in relation to Internet-related issues while newer organizations that follow more of a "bottom up" governance approach, such as the Internet Corporation for Assigned Names and Numbers (ICANN), now co-exist alongside intergovernmental organizations. In addition, since 2006, the IGF has been a platform for stakeholders to come together on an equal footing to discuss, exchange ideas and share good practices with each other. While many are embracing the engagement of stakeholders more directly in decisions and governance, others remain concerned that more intergovernmental involvement in the Internet is needed, especially on public policy issues. NETmundial and the Internet Assigned Numbers Authority (IANA) stewardship transition were noted as signs that Internet governance had reached a pivotal moment in its development.
 IANA Functions: NTIA's Stewardship Transition and ICANN's Accountability Process: This session was a response to two developments in the first half of 2014: 1) the announcement by the United States National Telecommunications and Information Administration (NTIA) in March 2014 to transition its stewardship of the IANA function to the global multistakeholder community; and 2) prompted by that announcement, a call by many in the ICANN community to examine ICANN's accountability in the absence of its historical contractual relationship with the United States Government. Both these issues also appeared in the NETmundial Multistakeholder Statement of São Paulo as issues with relevance to the broader Internet governance ecosystem. Members of the IANA Stewardship Coordination Group (ICG) - a group of representatives from a wide range of communities with an interest in IANA - are working to collate proposals developed by the communities with an interest in IANA into a single document that will be sent to the NTIA, outlining how NTIA's stewardship could be replaced by a global multistakeholder model. The ICG plans to have proposals submitted by different sectors of the community by the end of December 2014, with the intention of having the new stewardship mechanism agreed to by the community and accepted by the NTIA and in place before the September 2015 date for the renewal of the IANA contract. Concerns were expressed that when NTIA was no longer the authority reassigning the IANA contract, some future ICANN Board may overstep its boundaries.
 Taking Stock and Open Microphone Sessions: This session reflected on the main outputs of the IGF main sessions. Participants identified issues that could lend themselves to ongoing inter-sessional work and discussed appropriate ways to pursue this work. Some other overall suggestions were considered regarding the role of the IGF in the evolving Internet governance ecosystem.
 Closing Session: Several speakers, representing all stakeholder groups, addressed the Closing Session. Gratitude to the host country and all those who had participated and made the ninth IGF a success was expressed by everyone. Speakers reaffirmed the importance of the multistakeholder process and cooperation, and emphasized the importance of dialogue. Mr. Hartmut Glaser, the Executive Secretary of the Brazilian Internet Steering Committee, invited participants to the tenth IGF, 10–14 November 2015, in Joao Pessoa, Brazil. The representative of the United States of Mexico extended an invitation to all participants to attend the eleventh IGF Meeting in Mexico in 2016, subject to the extension of the IGF mandate.
 Best Practice Forums (BPFs): Best practice forums were held on the following topics:
 Developing Meaningful Multistakeholder Mechanisms
 Regulation and Mitigation of Unwanted Communications (Spam)
 Establishing and Supporting CERTS for Internet Security
 Creating an Enabling Environment for the Development of Local Content
 Online Child Safety and Protection
 Dynamic Coalitions: The following Dynamic Coalitions, informal, issue-specific groups comprising members of various stakeholder groups, met during IGF 2014:
 Dynamic Coalition on Gender and Internet Governance
 Dynamic Coalition on Public Access in Libraries
 Dynamic Coalition on Network Neutrality
 Dynamic Coalition on Child Online Safety: "Disrupting and Reducing the Availability of Child Sex Abuse Materials on the Internet - How Can Technology Help?"
 Dynamic Coalition on Internet and Climate Change
 Dynamic Coalition on Accessibility and Disability
 Dynamic Coalition on the Internet of Things
 Dynamic Coalition on Platform Responsibility
 Dynamic Coalition Internet Rights and Principles Dynamic Coalition: "The IRPC Charter of Human Rights and Principles for the Internet: Five Years On Youth Coalition on Internet Governance "
 Dynamic Coalition on Core Internet Values
 Dynamic Coalition on Freedom of Expression and Freedom of the Media on the Internet: "Battle for Free User Generated Content"
 Open Forums: Open Forums focus on an organizations activities during the past year and allow time for questions and discussions. Governments can also hold an open forum to present their Internet governance related activities. The following Open Forums were held:
 ICANN Governmental Advisory Committee (GAC) Open Forum
 Internet Society Open Forum: "ISOC @IGF: Dedicated to an Open Accessible Internet"
 Council of Europe Open Forum: "Your Internet, Our Aim: Guide Internet Users to Their Human Rights!"
 The Freedom Online Coalition Open Forum: "Protecting Human Rights Online"
 UNCTAD Open Forum: "Consultation on CSTD ten-year review of WSIS"
 UNESCO Open Forum: "Multistakeholder Consultation on UNESCO’s Comprehensive Study on the Internet"
 ICANN Open Forum
 Ministry of Science, ICT and Future Planning (MSIP)/Korea Internet & Security Agency (KISA) Open Forum: "Korea's Effort to Advance Internet Environment including IPv6 Deployment"
 Organisation for Economic Co-operation and Development (OECD) Open Forum: "The Economics of an Open Internet"
 ITU-UNICEF Open Forum: "Launch of Revised Guidelines for Industry on Child Online Protection, by ITU and UNICEF"
 World Wide Web Foundation Open Forum: "Measuring What and How: Capturing the Effects of the Internet We Want"
 Host country sessions:
 Child Online Protection : Roles and Responsibilities, Best Practices and Challenges
 Perspectives on Internet Governance Research and Scholarship
 Policies for Enabling Broadband: Special Focus on OTTs and Level Playing Fields
 National & International Information Sharing Model in Cybersecurity & CERTs
 High Level Leaders Meeting: Turkey convened a meeting on the topic of "Capacity Building for Economic Development". Thirty three high level leaders, including a deputy prime minister, ministers and deputy ministers, representatives of international organizations, presidents of regulatory bodies, leaders of entities from civil society, the private sector and the technical community spoke on this important topic.
 National and Regional IGF Roundtable: The national/regional IGF initiatives session was an interactive session that engaged coordinators and participants from the national and regional IGF initiatives and others interested or engaged in the initiatives. It was clear during the session that there is great diversity between the way that the national and regional IGFs conduct their respective engagements. One size does not fit all. The need to work together was acknowledged. There were suggestions on inter-sessional work can be done using the national and regional initiatives.
 Side meetings:
 Enhancing ICANN Accountability and Governance Town Hall Meeting
 WSIS+10 High-Level Event – Information Session
 Seed Alliance Awards Ceremony
 Geneva Internet Conference: "Promising 2014 - a head start to the decisive 2015"
 Geneva Internet Platform: Where Internet meets diplomacy
 Council of Europe: "A Human Rights Perspective on ICANN’s Policies and Procedures"
 10 Years of Internet Governance Book - 10 Thousands Copies - 10 Languages
 Privacy and the Right to be Forgotten
 Internet and Climate Change
 Launch of the GISWatch Report 2014
 APrIGF Multistakeholder Steering Group Open Meeting
 Friends of the IGF (FoIGF)
 Flash Sessions: The following Flash Sessions were held:
 Internet and Jurisdiction Project
 Crowd Sourced Solutions to Bridge the Gender Digital Divide
 Workshops: 89 Workshops were held, each exploring detailed issues related to the main themes of the IGF.
 Pre-events: The following pre-events were held:
 Pre-Conference Seminar for CLDP Supported Delegations
 Collaborative Leadership Exchange on Multistakeholder Participation
 Sex, Rights and Internet Governance
 Global Internet Governance Academic Network (GigaNet) - 9th Annual Symposium
 NETmundial: Looking Back, Learning Lessons and Mapping the Road Ahead (including a book launch - Beyond NETmundial: The Roadmap for Institutional Improvements to the Global Internet Governance Ecosystem)
 Integration of Diasporas and Displaced People Through ICT
 Consultation on CSTD Ten-year Review of WSIS: Latin American and the Caribbean perspective
 IGF Support Association
 Empowering Grassroots Level Organizations Through the .NGO Top Level Domain
 A Safe, Secure, Sustainable Internet and the Role of Stakeholders
 Supporting Innovation on Internet Development in the Global South through Evaluation, Research, Communication and Resource Mobilization
 Multilingualism Applied in Africa
 Governance in a Mobile Social Web – Finding the Markers

IGF X — João Pessoa, Brazil 2015
The tenth IGF meeting was held in João Pessoa, Brazil from 10 to 13 November 2015. The meeting included more than 150 sessions and 21 pre-events. The overarching theme for the meeting was: "Evolution of Internet Governance: Empowering Sustainable Development". The meeting was organized around eight sub-themes: (i) Cybersecurity and Trust; (ii) Internet Economy; (iii) Inclusiveness and Diversity; (iv) Openness; (v) Enhancing Multistakeholder Cooperation; (vi) Internet and Human Rights; (vii) Critical Internet Resources and (viii) Emerging Issues.

 Opening Ceremony and Opening Session: Brazilian Minister of Communications, André Figueiredo, reminded participants that in developing countries, access to the Internet for those still not yet connected to the information society remains the most pressing issue. Strong statements of support for the renewal of the IGF's mandate were made by several governments, including Turkey, the European Commission, the United States, Japan, and China, recognizing the invaluable multistakeholder synergy it brings to the discussion on Internet governance.
 IGF WSIS + 10 Consultations: This session brought together a diverse and inclusive group of stakeholders on an equal footing, to address and comment on the UNGA’s Overall Review of the Implementation of WSIS Outcomes Draft Outcome Document, released on 4 November 2015. The presence of the two co-facilitators of the High-Level review process enriched the deliberations and H.E. Mr. Janis Mazeiks, Permanent Representative of the Republic of Latvia and H.E. Mrs. Lana Zaki Nusseibeh, Permanent Representative of the United Arab Emirates confirmed that a report on the consultations held at the IGF would act as an input into the High-Level review of the UNGA set to take place on 17–18 December.
 Internet Economy and Sustainable Development: Deliberations on issues related to the Internet Economy and Sustainable Development coming from the IGF could serve as valuable inputs to the draft WSIS outcome document. UN agencies such as UNDESA, ITU, UNESCO, and UNCTAD can feed IGF discussions into synchronizing WSIS action lines to individual Sustainable Development Goals (SDGs). It was stressed that the Internet and ICTs can support all 17 SDGs and the IGF can contribute to enabling citizens across local economies to better understand the potential of ICTs and Internet access. Other recommendations coming from the session included:
 Creating more awareness about the SDGs, IGF, Multistakeholder mechanisms and how the Internet can help achieve SDGs on Regional and National levels, through different stakeholders and Governments.
 Inducing more investment into Internet innovation to serve the SDGs, through both public funds and Venture Capital incentives, among other channels.
 Engaging further local Small and Medium-Sized Enterprises (SMEs) in localized results serving the SDGs, from local content, to solutions serving different SDGs.
 Improving policies serving access, privacy and security of the Internet.
 Engaging more Women and youth.
 Fostering Internet entrepreneurship.
 Extending the Internet economy to marginalized groups and least developed countries (LDCs).
 Augmenting local content.
 Increase knowledge sharing, capacity building and preparation of youth for future employment.
 Transforming the digital divide into social inclusion.
 IGF Policy Options and Best Practices for Connecting the Next Billion: The intercessional work on "Policy Options for Connecting the Next Billion" was presented and discussed. The work of the IGF Best Practice Forums were also presented and it was suggested that moving forward BPF work could perhaps be fed into consultations through the National and Regional IGF initiatives.
 Enhancing Cybersecurity and Building Digital Trust: Recognizing the crucial need to enhance cybersecurity and build trust, this main session held valuable discussions with stakeholders coming from government, private sector and civil society. The general consensus coming from the session was that: 
 cybersecurity is everyone's problem and everyone should be aware and understand that the cyber world is a potential unsafe place;
 culture of cybersecurity is needed on different levels;
 individual action was encouraged to make the Internet safer; 
 there is a need for a comprehensive approach to tackling cybercrime and building trust, such as the introduction of security elements when developing cyber products and services; was highlighted. Participants also stressed the critical role that education plays a critical role in addressing cybercrime issues and should be expanded to involve all levels of society.
The involvement of the government, private sector, civil society and other stakeholders in handling cyber security was stressed as fundamental in terms of sharing best practices, sharing results of critical assessments and identifying globally accepted standards of cybersecurity. All stakeholders must understand, respect and trust each other’s expertise and competences.

 A Dialogue on ‘Zero Rating’ and Net Neutrality: Zero Rating (ZR) services provide a mobile broadband subscriber with access to select content, without that access counting against the subscriber's data cap. Two questions were posed to the speakers: 
 whether ZR assists in connecting the unconnected by offering Internet access to those who cannot afford it, and 
 whether ZR is a violation of net neutrality when it does not offer access the "full Internet."
The positions that were heard from expert speakers and session participants on ZR were extremely diverse. Some think ZR is a direct violation of Network Neutrality, others don’t even think that it is a Network Neutrality issue. The national regulators who participated in the session described completely different approaches to ZR. ZR is only one means of connecting more people to the Internet. The discussion talked about other means to increase access, such as the use of municipal Wi-Fi and wireless community networks. Further research is needed on this complex subject.

 Human Rights on the Internet: The session focused on three major areas of discussion: (i) freedom of expression, privacy, and assembly; (ii) access, human rights and development; and (iii) emerging issues. There is a growing recognition that human rights extend beyond enabling access to topics including:
 how the Internet enables sustainable development, 
 hate speech, 
 protecting journalists and citizen journalists to ensure freedom of expression online, 
 preventing the radicalization of youth, 
 the protection and promotion of privacy, 
 the relationship between surveillance and privacy,
 the importance of protecting women's and LGBT communities’ rights online and offline by addressing online abuse and gender-based violence, and 
 private sector responsibilities in promoting and protecting human rights online.
 The NETmundial Statement and the Evolution of the Internet Governance Ecosystem: The NETmundial Multistakeholder Statement covers a wide range of Internet Governance issues that are of great relevance to the IGF. The session took stock of how those issues are being advanced by the broader Internet governance community 18 months after the São Paulo meeting. Participants (in person and remotely) raised the following issues:
 The NETmundial Statement is still up to date and valuable in all of its recommendations.
 There was a general sense among the speakers with regard to the importance of promoting NETmundial principles in all tracks and spheres that form the Internet governance ecosystem. It is necessary however to analyse the meaning of those normative propositions according to the different local and regional contexts.
 Human rights and shared values have become a permanent item on the work agenda of Internet technical fora and organizations.
 International trade and cybersecurity (and their overlap with Internet governance) are critical areas for the advance of multistakeholder participation.
 There is a need for considering the opinion of people with disabilities in order to implement the provisions of the NETmundial Statement regarding accessibility.
 The NETmundial methodology is unequivocally one of the main reasons for its success. That methodology has to be studied and be used to enhance the methodologies applied at the IGF. Strong evidence, good arguments and high quality debate make a lot of difference for societal self-determination.
 One of the issues that led to the NETmundial Meeting was the issue of mass surveillance. Currently, that topic has not been dealt with satisfactorily.
 Child protection is still a matter of concern.
 It is disappointing that there is little or no mention of the NETmundial Meeting in the context of the WSIS+10 process.
 Closing Ceremony: The IGF by its nature is an inclusive environment, as are the National and Regional IGFs. Speakers urged delegates to leverage that inclusiveness and continue to strive for greater participation, particularly from developing countries, in IGF processes. By doing this it was said that we can help foster an open Internet, that has seen tremendous growth and innovation, provides an engine for economic growth and serves as a platform for expressing ideas, thought and creativity. Many speakers expressed great thanks to CGI Brazil and to the local and host country government officials and supporting staff. Ms. Yolanda Martínez, Head of the Digital Government Unit, Secretariat of Public Administration of Mexico, offered on behalf of the Government of Mexico to host the 11th IGF in 2016, pending the renewal of the IGF mandate [following IGF 2015, in December 2015 the IGF's mandate was extended by the UN General Assembly for ten years].
 IGF Best Practice Forum (BPF): Best practice forums were held on the following topics: 
 Online Abuse and Gender-Based Violence Against Women
 Enabling Environments to Establish Successful IXPs
 Creating an Enabling Environment for IPv6 Adoption
 Establishing and Supporting Computer Security Incident Response Teams (CSIRTs) for Internet Security
 Regulation and Mitigation of Unsolicited Communications
 Strengthening Multistakeholder Participation Mechanisms
 Dynamic Coalitions: Dynamic Coalitions (DCs) are informal, issue-specific groups comprising members of various stakeholder groups. At IGF 2015 Dynamic Coalitions were, for the first time, featured in a main session. A proposal that found broad support was to create a DC Coordination Group. The main task of the group would be to develop a charter for all DCs with common principles and rules of procedure they would agree to adhere to, such as having open lists and open archives. The Group would also look at areas of overlap and duplication and aim to create synergies among the DCs. The following Dynamic Coalitions met during IGF 2015: 
 on Accessibility and Disability,
 on Accountability of Internet Governance Venues (new),
 on Blockchain Technologies,
 on Child Online Safety (new), 
 on Core Internet Values,
 on Freedom of Expression and Freedom of the Media (new), 
 on Gender and Internet Governance,
 on the Internet of Things,
 on Internet Rights and Principles,
 on Network Neutrality,
 on Platform Responsibility,
 on Public Access in Libraries, and
 Youth Coalition on Internet Governance.
 Open Forums: Open Forums focus on an organizations activities during the past year and allow time for questions and discussions. Governments can also hold an open forum to present their Internet governance related activities. The following Open Forums were held: 
 Asia-Pacific Regional Internet Registry (APNIC): The Internet Number Community and their related organizations 
 Association for Progressive Communications (APC): Networking globally and acting locally: 25 years of working for an Internet for all 
 Commonwealth Telecommunications Organisation: Commonwealth Internet Governance Forum 
 Council of Europe: An enabling environment for Internet freedom 
 Digital Infrastructure Association (DINL): The Public Core of the Internet – Towards a framework for sustainable interaction between governments and the Internet ecosystem 
 DiploFoundation and Geneva Internet Platform: Geneva Internet Platform and DiploFoundation — ideas, words and actions 
 European Broadcasting Union in partnership with EuroDIG organizers: Messages from Europe 
 European Commission & Global Internet Policy Observatory (GIPO): Progress of Global Internet Policy Observatory – Open debate on usability and inclusivity of the platform 
 Freedom Online Coalition: Protecting Human Rights Online
 National ICT Ministry of Paraguay: Digital E-Gov Initiatives in Paraguay 
 Institute of Electrical and Electronics Engineers (IEEE): Advancing Technology for an Open Internet 
 International Telecommunication Union (ITU): Fostering SMEs in the ICT Sector – The new global ICT Entrepreneurship Initiative 
 Internet Corporation for Assigned Names and Numbers (ICANN): ICANN Open Forum 
 Internet Society (ISOC): Bringing people together around the world 
 Ministry of Education of Cuba: Internet as a pathway from school to exercise the human right of access to information
 Office of the United Nations High Commissioner for Human Rights, jointly with the Council of Europe: The right to privacy in the digital age 
 Organisation for Economic Co-operation and Development (OECD): Digital Economy for Innovation, Growth and Social Prosperity – towards the 2016 OECD Ministerial 
 UN Conference on Trade and Development (UNCTAD): UNCTAD Open Forum 
 UN Educational, Scientific and Cultural Organization (UNESCO): Keystones to Foster Inclusive Knowledge Societies – Launching UNESCO's Comprehensive Study on the Internet 
 World Intellectual Property Organization (WIPO): WIPO Open Forum
 Pre-events and other sessions:
 Should education 3.0 and children be part of Internet governance?
 Internet Governance, Security and Privacy in 2030
 Global Commission on Internet Governance
 Diplo_GIP Digital Watch 
 Inter regional dialogue session

IGF XI — Guadalajara, Mexico 2016
The eleventh IGF meeting was held in Guadalajara, Mexico, from 6 to 9 December 2016. The meeting included 205 sessions as well as 24 pre-events (7 host country and ceremonial sessions; 8 main sessions; 96 workshops; 31 open forums; 4 individual Best Practice Forum sessions; 14 individual Dynamic Coalition sessions; 23 lightning sessions; 5 unconference sessions; 17 sessions classified "other"; and 24 pre-events). Experimental Lightning and Unconference sessions were held for the first time. A newcomers track helped participants attending the IGF meeting for the first time, to understand the IGF processes, foster the integration of all new-coming stakeholders into the IGF community, and make the meeting participant's first IGF experience as productive and welcoming as possible.

The overarching theme for the meeting was: "Enabling Inclusive and Sustainable Growth". The meeting addressed a broad range of themes and issues including, but not limited to, Sustainable Development and the Internet Economy; Access and Diversity; Gender and Youth Issues; Human Rights Online; Cybersecurity; Multistakeholder Cooperation; Critical Internet Resources; Internet governance capacity building; and Emerging Issues that may affect the future of the open Internet.

IGF XII — Geneva, Switzerland 2017
The twelfth IGF meeting took place in Geneva, Switzerland, from 18 to 21 December 2017. The programme included 4 host country and ceremonial sessions; 8 main/special sessions; 99 workshops; 45 open forums; 4 individual BPF sessions; 15 individual DC sessions; 8 individual NRIs sessions; 13 sessions classified as “other”; 24 lightning sessions; and 40 Day 0 events; for a total of 260 sessions in the overall programme (220 if Day 0 events are not counted). 55 booths were featured in the IGF Village.

The overarching meeting theme was "Shape Your Digital Future!". The meeting addressed a broad range of issues including, the future of global cooperation on Digital Governance; the impact of digitization on democracy, public trust and public opinion; Internet and the Sustainable Development Goals; access and diversity; the digital transformation and its socio-economic and labour impacts; youth and gender challenges pertaining to the Internet; the protection and promotion of human rights online; cybersecurity; intended and unintended global impacts of local interventions; the need to enhance multistakeholder cooperation; critical Internet resources; Internet governance capacity-building; and other emerging issues that enhance and affect the future of the open Internet.

IGF XIII — Paris, France 2018

The thirteenth IGF meeting took place in Paris, from 12 to 14 November 2018. In addition to the Opening and Closing Sessions, the IGF 2018 programme featured 8 main/special sessions; 71 workshops; 27 open forums; 5 individual best practice forum (BPF) sessions; 15 individual dynamic coalition (DC) sessions; 5 individual national, regional, and youth (NRIs) collaborative sessions; 14 sessions classified as “other”; and 24 lightning sessions; for a total of 171 sessions in the overall programme.

IGF XIII was held as part of the Paris Digital Week which, in addition to the IGF, featured the inaugural events of the Paris Peace Forum and the Govtech Summit. UN Secretary-General (SG) António Guterres addressed the IGF, marking the first time in Forum’s history that a SG has attended in person. French President Macron addressed the IGF at the opening ceremony and launched the "Paris Call for Trust and Security in Cyberspace", a framework for regulating the Internet and fighting back against cyber attacks, hate speech and other cyber threats. Eight themes formed the backbone of the 2018 agenda: (i) Cybersecurity, Trust and Privacy; (ii) Development, Innovation and Economic Issues; (iii) Digital Inclusion and Accessibility; (iv) Human Rights, Gender and Youth; (v) Emerging Technologies; (vi) Evolution of Internet Governance; (vii) Media and Content; and (viii) Technical and Operational Issues.

IGF XIV — Berlin, Germany 2019
The fourteenth IGF meeting took place in Berlin, from 25 to 29 November 2019.

IGF XV — online, 2020
The Fifteenth Annual Meeting of the Internet Governance Forum (IGF) was hosted online by the United Nations under the overarching theme: Internet for human resilience and solidarity. The first phase was hosted on 2-6 November and the second one on 9-17 November 2020. Visit IGF 2020 Meeting Page: https://www.intgovforum.org/vIGF/

IGF XVI — Katowice, Poland 2021

The 16th annual IGF meeting was hosted by the Government of Poland in Katowice from 6-10 December, under the overarching theme: Internet United, see https://www.gov.pl/web/igf2021-en

IGF XVII — Addis Ababa, Ethiopia 2022

The 17th annual IGF meeting was hosted by the Government of Ethiopia in Addis Ababa from 28 November to 2 December, under the overarching theme: Resilient Internet for a Shared Sustainable and Common Future, see https://igf2022.intgovforum.org/en

Upcoming IGF meetings

IGF XVIII — Kyoto, Japan 2023
The 18th annual IGF meeting will be hosted by the Government of Japan in Kyoto from 8-12 October.

IGF Attendance

Onsite attendance
Onsite attendance at the first IGF meeting in 2006 was estimated to be around one thousand participants and has grown to between 1500 and 2200 participants from over 100 countries. In recent years participants have typically been roughly 60% men and 40% women. Participants are drawn from civil society, governments, the private sector, the technical community, the media, and intergovernmental organizations.

 IGF I — Athens, Greece 2006: Attendance was estimated to be around one thousand participants.
 IGF II — Rio de Janeiro, Brazil 2007: There were over 2,100 registered participants prior to the meeting, of which 700 came from civil society, 550 from government, 300 from business entities, 100 from international organizations, and 400 representing other categories. The meeting was attended by 1,363 participants from 109 countries. Over 100 members of the press attended.
 IGF III — Hyderabad, India 2008: The meeting was held in the aftermath of terrorist attacks in Mumbai. While these tragic events led to some cancellations, the overall attendance with 1280 participants from 94 countries, of which 133 were media representatives, was close to that at the second annual meeting.
 IGF IV — Sharm El Sheikh, Egypt 2009: With more than 1800 participants from 112 countries the Sharm meeting had the largest attendance of any IGF to date. 96 governments were represented. 122 media representatives were accredited.
 IGF V — Vilnius, Lithuania 2010: With close to 2000 badges issued and 1461 participants, attendance at the Vilnius meeting was similar to the 2009 meeting in Sharm El Sheikh.
 IGF VI — Nairobi, Kenya 2011: More than 2,000 participants attended, the highest attendance of IGF meetings held so far. 125 governments were represented. 68 media representatives were accredited. The approximate nationality distribution was: African (53%), WEOG-Western European and Others Group (29%), Asian (11%), GRULAC-Latin American and Caribbean Group (4%) and Eastern Europe (3%).
 IGF VII — Baku, Azerbaijan 2012: More than 1,600 delegates representing 128 different countries attended with a particularly strong presence from civil society as this was the highest represented stakeholder group at the forum. Participation was regionally diverse and the participation of women at the forum increased significantly from previous years. Youth representation and activity was also sited to be a notable achievement.
 IGF VIII — Bali, Indonesia 2013: Nearly 1,500 delegates representing 111 different countries convened in Bali. Once again civil society was the largest represented stakeholder group at the forum.
 IGF IX — Istanbul, Turkey 2014: More than 2,400 delegates representing 144 different countries convened in Istanbul. Once again civil society was the largest represented stakeholder group at the forum with 779 participants, followed by the private sector with 581, governments with 571, the technical community with 266, the media with 110, and intergovernmental organizations with 96. The approximate regional distribution was: Turkey (31%), Africa (8%), WEOG-Western European and Others (32%), Asia Pacific (17%), GRULAC-Latin American and Caribbean Group (6%) and Eastern Europe (6%).
 IGF X —  João Pessoa, Brazil 2015: More than 2,130 delegates representing 112 different countries convened in João Pessoa. Once again civil society was the largest represented stakeholder group at the forum with 44% of the participants, followed by governments with 22%, the private sector with 12%, the technical community with 10%, the media with 8%, and intergovernmental organizations with 4%. The approximate regional distribution was: Brazil (49%), Africa (5%), WEOG-Western European and Others (26%), Asia Pacific (8%), GRULAC-Latin American and Caribbean Group (9%) and Eastern Europe (3%). 62% of the participants were men and 38% were women.
 IGF XI —  Jalisco, Mexico 2016: The program included 229 sessions attended by more than 2,000 onsite participants, from 123 countries. Once again civil society was the largest represented stakeholder group at the forum with 45% of the participants, followed by governments with 21%, the private sector with 15%, the technical community with 14%, the media with 3%, and intergovernmental organizations with 3%. The approximate regional distribution was: Africa (7%), WEOG-Western European and Others (27%), Asia Pacific (13%), GRULAC-Latin American and Caribbean Group (51%) and Eastern Europe (3%). 60% of the participants were men and 40% were women.
 IGF XII —  Geneva, Switzerland 2017: The program included 220 sessions attended by more than 2,000 onsite participants, from 142 countries. Once again civil society was the largest represented stakeholder group at the forum with 45% of the participants, followed by governments with 20%, the private sector with 15%, the technical community with 14%, the media with 0.4%, and intergovernmental organizations with 6%. The approximate regional distribution was: Africa (11%), WEOG-Western European and Others (46%), Asia Pacific (18%), GRULAC-Latin American and Caribbean Group (12%) and Eastern Europe (8%). 57% of the participants were men and 43% were women.
 IGF XIII —  Paris, France 2018: The program included 171 sessions attended by more than 1,600 onsite participants, from 143 countries. Civil society was the largest represented stakeholder group at the forum with 45% of the participants, followed by governments with 16%, the private sector with 20%, the technical community with 11%, the media with 1%, and intergovernmental organizations with 7%. The approximate regional distribution was: Africa (25%), WEOG-Western European and Others (38%), Asia Pacific (16%), GRULAC-Latin American and Caribbean Group (9%), Eastern Europe (6%), and Intergovernmental Organizations (6%). 57% of the participants were men and 43% were women.

Remote participation
The Remote Participation Working Group (RPWG) has worked closely with the IGF Secretariat starting in 2008 to allow remote participants across the globe to interact in the IGF meetings.

 IGF I — Athens, Greece 2006: Remote participants were able to take part via blogs, chat rooms, email, and text messaging.
 IGF II — Rio de Janeiro, Brazil 2007: The entire meeting was webcast and transcribed in real time. Video and text records were made available on the IGF Web site.
 IGF III — Hyderabad, India 2008: The entire meeting was webcast in real-time using high quality video, audio streaming, and live chat. There were 522 remote participants from around the world who joined the main sessions and workshops. Remote hubs were also introduced with remote moderators leading discussions in their region. Most of the hubs were able to discuss pertinent local and domestic Internet Governance issues. The Remote Hubs were located in Buenos Aires, Argentina, Belgrade, Serbia, São Paulo (Brazil), Pune (India), Lahore (Pakistan), Bogotà (Colombia), Barcelona and Madrid (Spain). The platform used for remote participation was DimDim. The text transcripts of the main sessions, the video and audio records of all workshops and other meetings were made available through the IGF Web site.
 IGF IV — Sharm El Sheikh, Egypt 2009: The entire meeting was Webcast, with video streaming provided from the main session room and audio streaming provided from all workshop meeting rooms. The proceedings of the main sessions were transcribed and displayed in the main session hall in real-time and streamed to the Web. Remote hubs in 11 locations around the world allowed remote participation. The text transcripts of the main sessions, the video and audio records of all workshops and other meetings were made available through the IGF Web site. Webex was used as the remote participation platform.
 IGF V — Vilnius, Lithuania 2010: The entire meeting was Webcast, with video streaming provided from the main session room and all nine other meeting rooms. All proceedings were transcribed and displayed in the meeting rooms in real-time and streamed to the Web. Remote hubs in 32 locations around the world provided the means for more than 600 people who could not travel to the meeting to participate actively in the forum and contribute to discussions.The text transcripts as well as the video and audio records of all official meetings are archived on the IGF Web site.
 IGF VI — Nairobi, Kenya 2011: All the main sessions and workshops had real time transcription. The entire meeting was Webcast, with video streaming provided from the main session room and audio streaming provided from all workshop meeting rooms. Remote hubs were established in 47 locations, and provided the means for more than 823 people participate contribute to discussions. 38 remote participants/panelists participated via video or audio and an approximate 2,500 connections were made throughout the week from 89 countries. The text transcripts and video of all meetings were made available through the IGF Website.
 IGF VII — Baku, Azerbaijan 2012: Real time transcription was available. The entire meeting was webcast and remote participation was offered, which doubled the active participation in main sessions, workshops, and other events. 49 expert remote participants and panelists participated in various sessions via video and audio. 52 different remote ‘hubs’ allowed remote participants to gather together to follow the proceedings in Baku online. There was also an increase in social media activity allowing discussions to begin prior to the start of the meeting, continue between sessions and during breaks throughout the week and extend after delegates left Baku to return home. There were thousands of ‘tweets’ about the forum each day, which reached millions of followers.
 IGF VIII — Bali, Indonesia 2013: Real time transcription was available. The entire meeting was web-cast and remote participation more than doubled the in person participation. Approximately 1,704 connections were made to the meetings remotely from participants from 83 different countries. All web-cast videos were immediately uploaded to YouTube after the sessions ended allowing for additional public viewership. There were approximately 25 remote hubs and more than 100 remote presenters. Millions of interested individuals followed the proceedings on Twitter.
 IGF IX — Istanbul, Turkey 2014:  There were nearly 1,300 remote participants. Real time transcription was available. The entire meeting was web-cast and all web-cast videos were uploaded to YouTube after sessions ended allowing for additional public viewership. Flickr, Facebook, Twitter, and Tumblr were all widely used. Twitter messages using the hashtag, #IGF2014, reached more than 4 million people each day.
 IGF X — João Pessoa, Brazil 2015: Approximately 50 remote hubs were organized around the world, with an estimated 2000 active participants online. Real time transcription was available. The entire meeting was web-cast and all web-cast videos were uploaded to YouTube after sessions ended allowing for additional public viewership. Flickr, Facebook, Twitter, and Tumblr were all widely used.
 IGF XI — Jalisco, Mexico 2016: 45 remote hubs were organized around the world, with 2,000 stakeholders participating online. The largest number of online participants came from the following countries: United States, Mexico, Nigeria, Brazil, India, Cuba, United Kingdom, China, Japan, Tunisia and Argentina.
 IGF XII —  Geneva, Switzerland 2017: 32 remote hubs were organised around the world, with 1661 stakeholders participating online. The largest number of online participants came from the following countries: United States, Switzerland, Nigeria, China, India, Brazil, France, United Kingdom and Mexico.
 IGF XIII —  Paris, France 2018: Approximately 1400 people from 101 different countries participated online with the majority coming from France, United States, Brazil, Nigeria, United Kingdom, India, Iran, Bangladesh, and Germany. There were 35 remote hubs organised around the world representing all regions, 42% from Africa and 22% from both the Latin America and Caribbean and the Asia-Pacific regions, with an active online presence, video-sharing and live-comments.

See also

 Internet governance

References

External links
Internet Governance Forum, official website
Internet Governance Forum Support Association, helps to provide support and funding for the IGF Secretariat and related activities. 
Internet Society at the IGF, information on Internet Society contributions to the IGF and its IGF Ambassador Programme.
Association for Progressive Communications (APC) on the IGF, recommendations and publications from the civil society network for social justice and sustainable development.

Meetings

Organizations established in 2006
Information and communication technologies for development
Internet governance organizations
Organizations established by the United Nations